= Citroën 2CV =

Small car manufactured by Citroën (1948–1990)

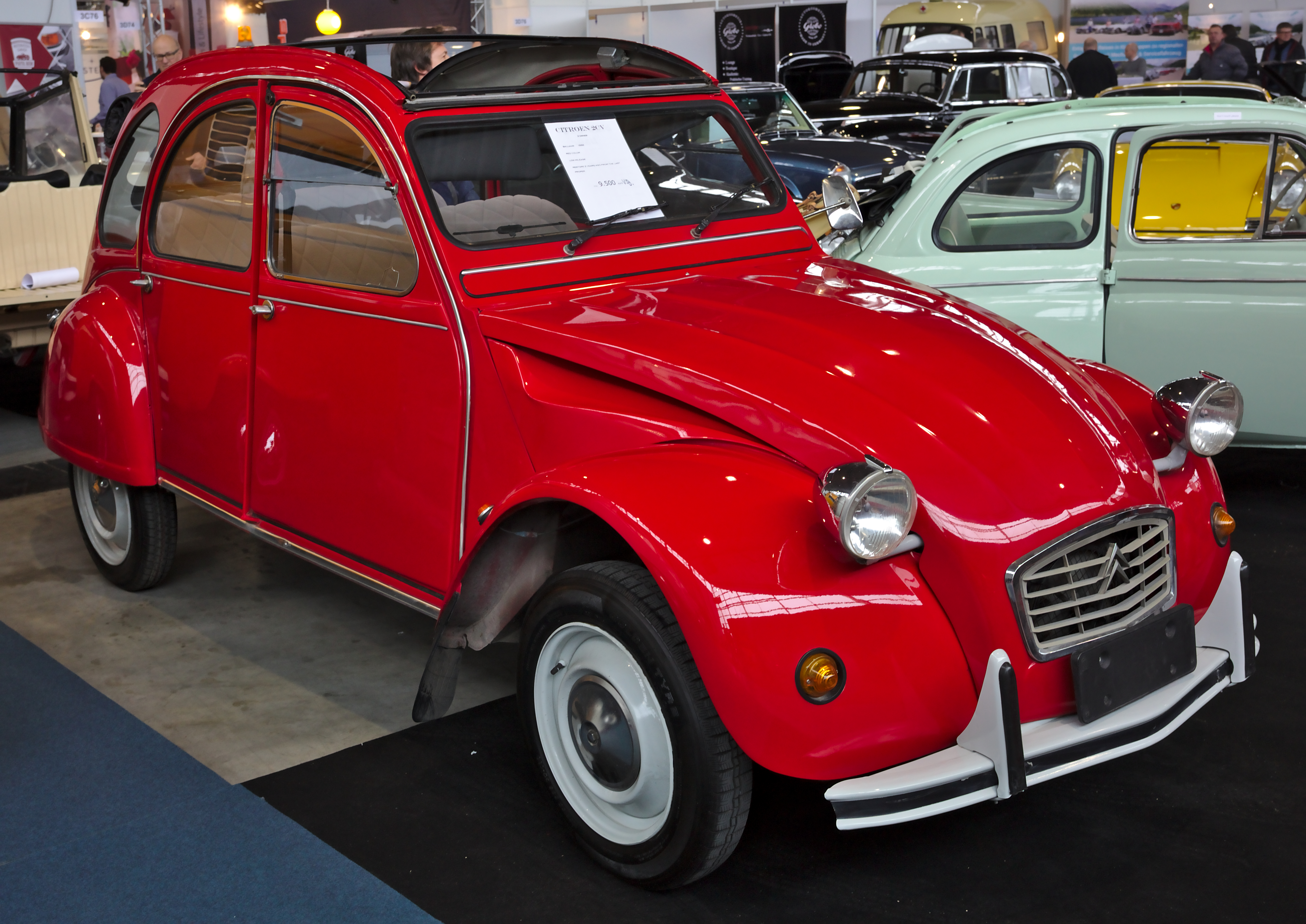

Overview
- Manufacturer: Citroën
- Production: 1948–1990
- Assembly: France: Levallois-Perret; Argentina: Jeppener (1960–1962); Argentina: Buenos Aires (1962–1980); Belgium: Forest/Vorst; Belgium: Liège; Chile: Arica; Portugal: Mangualde (Mangualde Plant: 1988–1990); Spain: Vigo (Vigo Plant); United Kingdom: Slough, England; Uruguay: Montevideo (panel van, pick-up); Yugoslavia: Koper, Slovenia (Cimos)
- Designer: André Lefèbvre; Flaminio Bertoni; Walter Becchia; Marcel Chinon

Body and chassis
- Class: Economy car
- Body style: 4-door saloon; 5-door hatchback (3CV); 2-door panel van; 2-door pick-up; 2-door coupé utility
- Layout: Front-engine, front-wheel-drive; Dual-engine, four-wheel-drive
- Related: Citroën Ami; Citroën Dyane; Citroën Acadiane; Citroën FAF; Citroën Méhari; Citroën Bijou

Powertrain
- Engine: 375 cc air-cooled H2; 425 cc air-cooled H2; 435 cc air-cooled H2; 602 cc air-cooled H2 (Argentina)
- Transmission: 4-speed manual

Dimensions
- Wheelbase: 2,400 mm (94.5 in)
- Length: 3,860 mm (152.0 in)
- Width: 1,480 mm (58.3 in)
- Height: 1,600 mm (63.0 in)
- Curb weight: 600 kg (1,323 lb)

Chronology
- Successor: Citroën Dyane; Citroën AX (indirectly); Citroën Acadiane (for van models)

The Citroën 2CV (French: deux chevaux, pronounced [dø ʃ(ə)vo], lit. "two horses", meaning "two taxable horsepower") is an economy car produced by the French company Citroën from 1948 to 1990. Introduced at the 1948 Paris Salon de l'Automobile, it has an air-cooled engine that is mounted in the front and drives the front wheels.

Conceived by Citroën vice-president Pierre Boulanger to help motorise the large number of farmers still using horses and carts in 1930s France, the 2CV has a combination of innovative engineering and straightforward, utilitarian bodywork. The 2CV featured overall low cost of ownership, simplicity of maintenance, an easily serviced air-cooled engine (originally offering 6.6 kW, 9 hp), and minimal fuel consumption. In addition, it was designed to cross a freshly ploughed field with a basket full of eggs on the passenger's seat without breaking them, because of the great lack of paved roads in France at the time, with its long-travel suspension system that connects front and rear wheels, giving a very soft ride.

Often called "an umbrella on wheels", the fixed-profile convertible bodywork featured a full-width, canvas, roll-back sunroof, which accommodated oversized loads, and until 1955 even stretched to cover the car's trunk, reaching almost down to the car's rear bumper. Michelin introduced and first commercialised the revolutionary new radial tyre design with the introduction of the 2CV.

Between 1948 and 1990, more than 3.8 million 2CVs were produced, making it the world's first front-wheel drive car to become a million seller after Citroën's own earlier model, the more upmarket Traction Avant, which had become the first front-wheel drive car to sell in similar six-figure numbers. The 2CV platform spawned many variants; the 2CV and its variants are collectively known as the A-Series. Notably these include the 2CV-based delivery vans known as fourgonnettes, the Ami, the Dyane, the Acadiane, and the Méhari. In total, Citroën manufactured over 9 million of the 2CVs and its derivative models.

A 1953 technical review in Autocar described "the extraordinary ingenuity of this design, which is undoubtedly the most original since the Model T Ford". In 2011, The Globe and Mail called it a "car like no other". The motoring writer L. J. K. Setright described the 2CV as "the most intelligent application of minimalism ever to succeed as a car", and a car of "remorseless rationality".

Both the design and the history of the 2CV mirror the Volkswagen Beetle in significant ways. Conceived in the 1930s, to make motorcars affordable to regular people for the first time in their countries, both went into large scale production in the late 1940s, featuring air-cooled boxer engines at the same end as their driven axle, omitting a length-wise drive shaft, riding on exactly the same 2,400 mm (94.5 in) wheelbase, and using a platform chassis to facilitate the production of derivative models. Just like the Beetle, the 2CV became not only a million seller but also one of the few cars in history to continue a single generation in production for over four decades.

A prototype was developed in the late 1990s under the name "Citroën 2CV 2000", but it did not enter production. An electric vehicle 2CV concept, unveiled in 2026, is scheduled to enter production in 2028.

== History ==
=== Pre-production ===
In 1934, family-owned Michelin, as the largest creditor, took over the bankrupt Citroën company. The new management commissioned a market survey, conducted by Jacques Duclos. France at that time had a large rural population which could not yet afford cars; Citroën used the survey results to prepare a design brief for a low-priced, rugged "umbrella on four wheels" that would enable four people to transport 50 kg (110 lb) of farm goods to market at 50 km/h (30 mph), if necessary across muddy, unpaved roads. In fuel economy, the car would use no more than 3 L/100 km (95 mpg_{‑imp}; 80 mpg_{‑US}). One design parameter required that customers be able to transport eggs across a freshly ploughed field without breakage.

In 1936, Pierre-Jules Boulanger, vice-president of Citroën and chief of engineering and design, sent the brief to his design team at the engineering department. The TPV (Toute Petite Voiture – "Very Small Car") was to be developed in secrecy at Michelin facilities at Clermont-Ferrand and at Citroën in Paris, by the design team which had created the Traction Avant.

Boulanger closely monitored all decisions relating to the TPV, proposing strictly reduced target weights. He created a department to weigh and redesign each component, to lighten the TPV without compromising function.

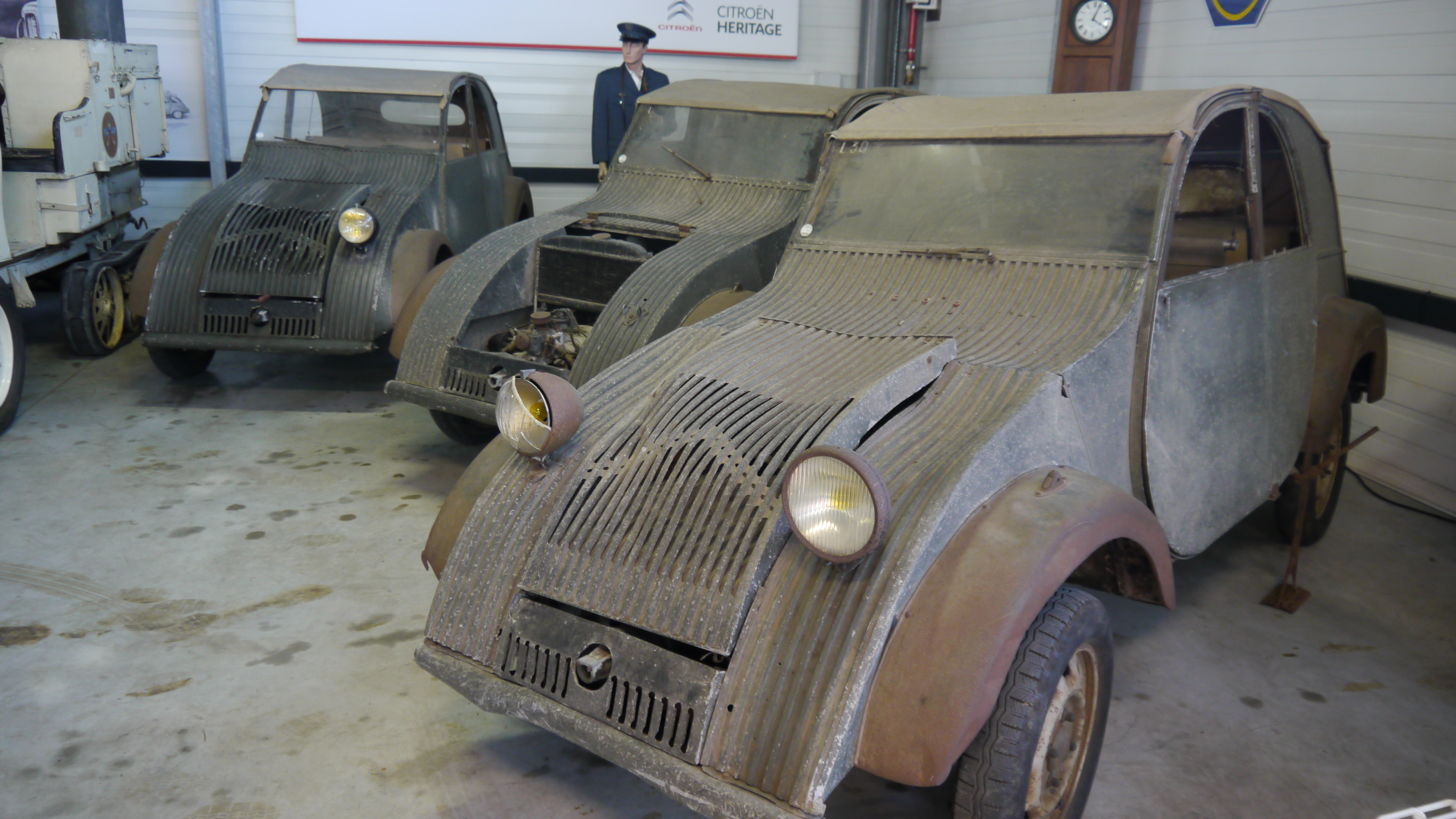
Three unrestored TPVs

Boulanger placed engineer André Lefèbvre in charge of the TPV project. Lefèbvre had designed and raced Grand Prix cars; his speciality was chassis design and he was particularly interested in maintaining contact between tyres and the road surface.

The first prototypes were bare chassis with rudimentary controls, seating and roof; test drivers wore leather flying suits, of the type used in contemporary open biplanes. By the end of 1937 20 TPV experimental prototypes had been built and tested. The prototypes had only one headlight, all that was required by French law at the time. On 29 December 1937, Pierre Michelin was killed in a car crash; Boulanger became president of Citroën.

By 1939 the TPV was deemed ready, after 47 technically different and incrementally improved experimental prototypes had been built and tested. These prototypes used aluminium and magnesium parts and had water-cooled flat twin engines with front-wheel drive. The seats were hammocks hung from the roof by wires. The suspension system, designed by Alphonse Forceau, used front leading arms and rear trailing arms, connected to eight torsion bars beneath the rear seat: a bar for the front axle, one for the rear axle, an intermediate bar for each side, and an overload bar for each side. The front axle was connected to its torsion bars by cable. The overload bar came into play when the car had three people on board, two in the front and one in the rear, to support the extra load of a fourth passenger and 50 kilogrammes of luggage.

In mid-1939 a pilot run of 250 cars was produced and on 28 August 1939 the car received approval for the French market. Brochures were printed and preparations made to present the car, renamed the Citroën 2CV, at the forthcoming Paris Motor Show in October 1939.

One innovation included from the beginning of production was Michelin's new radial tyre, first commercialised with the introduction of the 2CV. This radial design is an integral part of the design of the 2CV chassis.

=== World War II ===
Water-cooled engine from the TPV

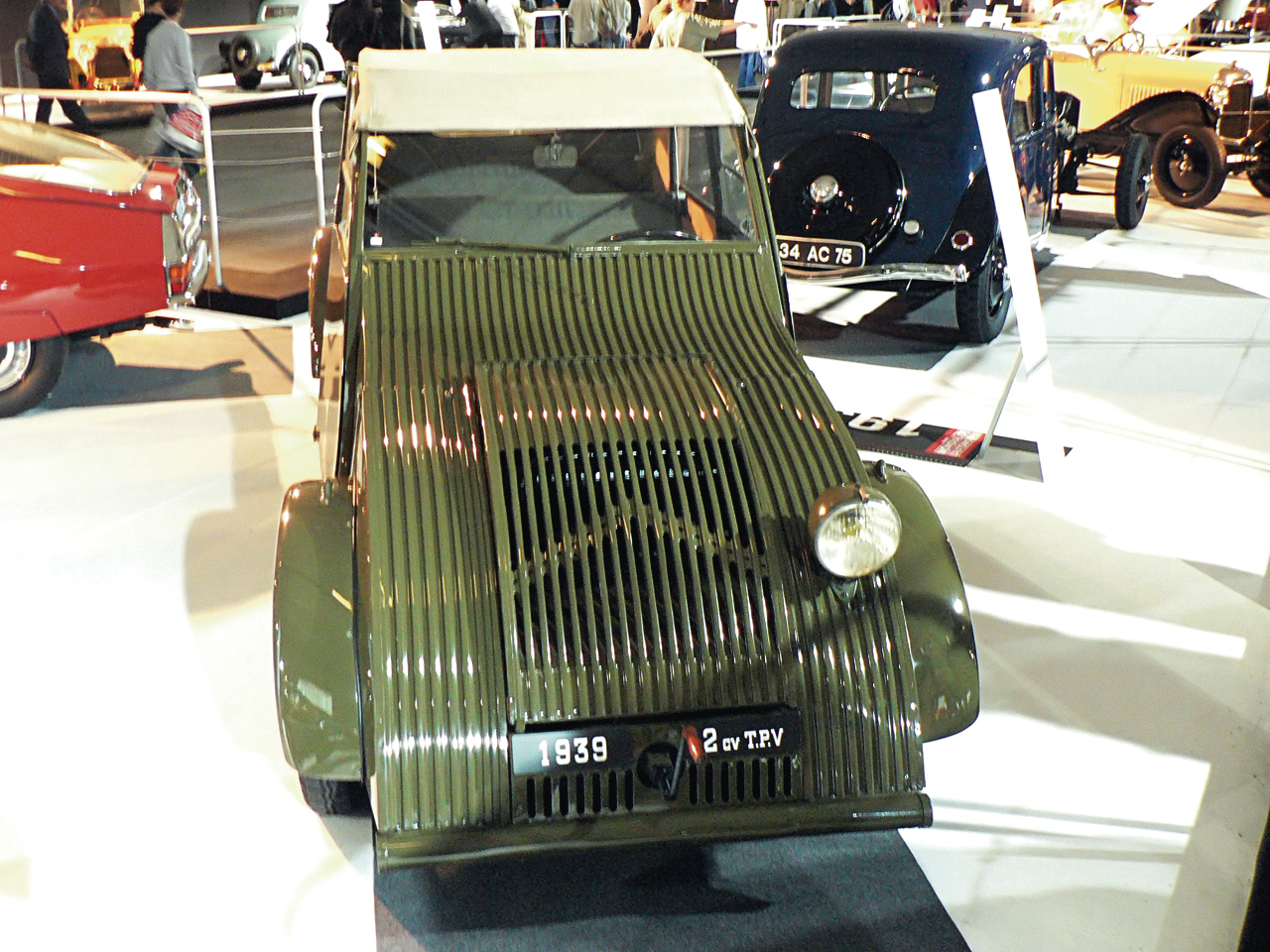
Restored Citroën TPV with a single headlight

On 3 September 1939, France declared war on Germany following its invasion of Poland. An atmosphere of impending disaster led to the cancellation of the 1939 motor show less than a month before it was scheduled to open. The launch of the 2CV was abandoned.

During the German occupation of France in World War II Boulanger personally refused to collaborate with German authorities to the point where the Gestapo listed him as an "enemy of the Reich", under constant threat of arrest and deportation to Germany.

Michelin (Citroën's main shareholder) and Citroën managers decided to hide the TPV project from the Nazis, fearing some military application as in the case of the future Volkswagen Beetle, manufactured during the war as the military Kübelwagen. Several TPVs were buried at secret locations; one was disguised as a pickup, the others were destroyed, and Boulanger spent the next six years thinking about further improvements. Until 1994, when three TPVs were discovered in a barn, it was believed that only two prototypes had survived. As of 2003, there were five known TPVs.

By 1941, after an increase in aluminium prices of 40%, an internal report at Citroën showed that producing the TPV post-war would not be economically viable, given the projected further increasing cost of aluminium. Boulanger decided to redesign the car to use mostly steel with flat panels, instead of aluminium. The Nazis had attempted to loot Citroën's press tools; this was frustrated after Boulanger got the French Resistance to relabel the rail cars containing them in the Paris marshalling yard. They ended up all over Europe, and Citroën was by no means sure they would all be returned after the war. In early 1944 Boulanger made the decision to abandon the water-cooled two-cylinder engine developed for the car and installed in the 1939 versions. Walter Becchia was now briefed to design an air-cooled unit, still of two cylinders, and still of 375 cc. Becchia was also supposed to design a three-speed gearbox, but managed to design a four-speed for the same space at little extra cost. At this time small French cars like the Renault Juvaquatre and Peugeot 202 usually featured three-speed transmissions, as did Citroën's own mid-size Traction Avant – but the 1936 Italian Fiat 500 "Topolino" "people's car" did have a four-speed gearbox. Becchia persuaded Boulanger that the fourth gear was an overdrive. The increased number of gear ratios also helped to pull the extra weight of changing from light alloys to steel for the body and chassis. Other changes included seats with tubular steel frames with rubber band springing and a restyling of the body by the Italian Flaminio Bertoni. Also, in 1944 the first studies of the Citroën hydro-pneumatic suspension were conducted using the TPV/2CV.

The development and production of what was to become the 2CV was also delayed by the incoming 1944 socialist French government, after the liberation by the Allies from the Germans. The five-year "Plan Pons" to ration car production and husband scarce resources, named after economist and former French motor industry executive Paul-Marie Pons, only allowed Citroën the upper middle range of the car market, with the Traction Avant. The French government allocated the economy car market, US Marshall Plan aid, US production equipment and supplies of steel, to newly nationalised Renault to produce its Renault 4CV. The "Plan Pons" came to an end in 1949. Postwar French roads were very different from pre-war ones. Horse-drawn vehicles had re-appeared in large numbers. The few internal-combustion–engined vehicles present often ran on town gas stored in gasbags on roofs or wood/charcoal gas from gasifiers on trailers. Only 100,000 of the two million pre-war cars were still on the road. The time was known as "Les années grises" or "the grey years" in France.

=== Development ===
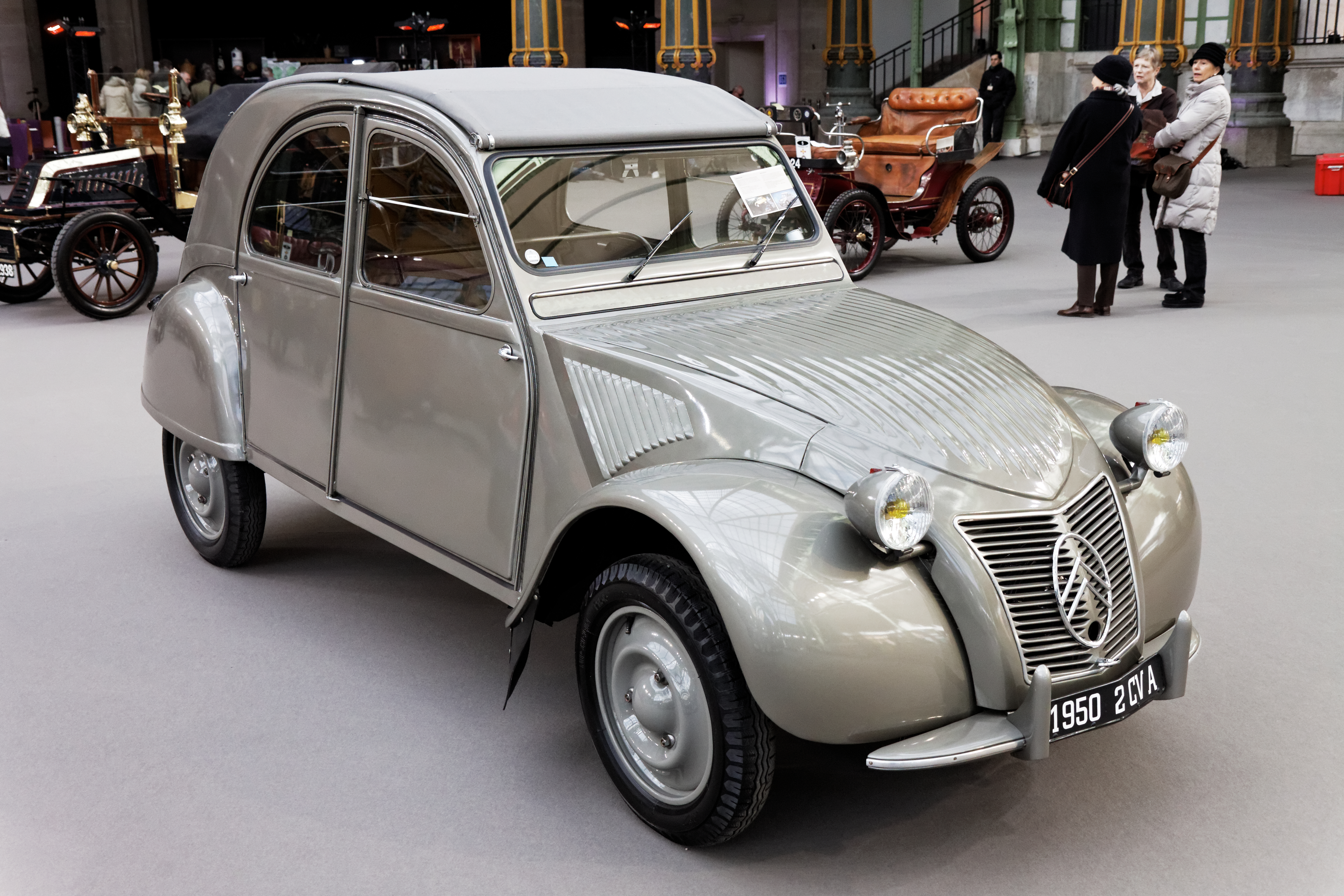
First generation "ripple bonnet" Citroën 2CV built from 1949 to 1960

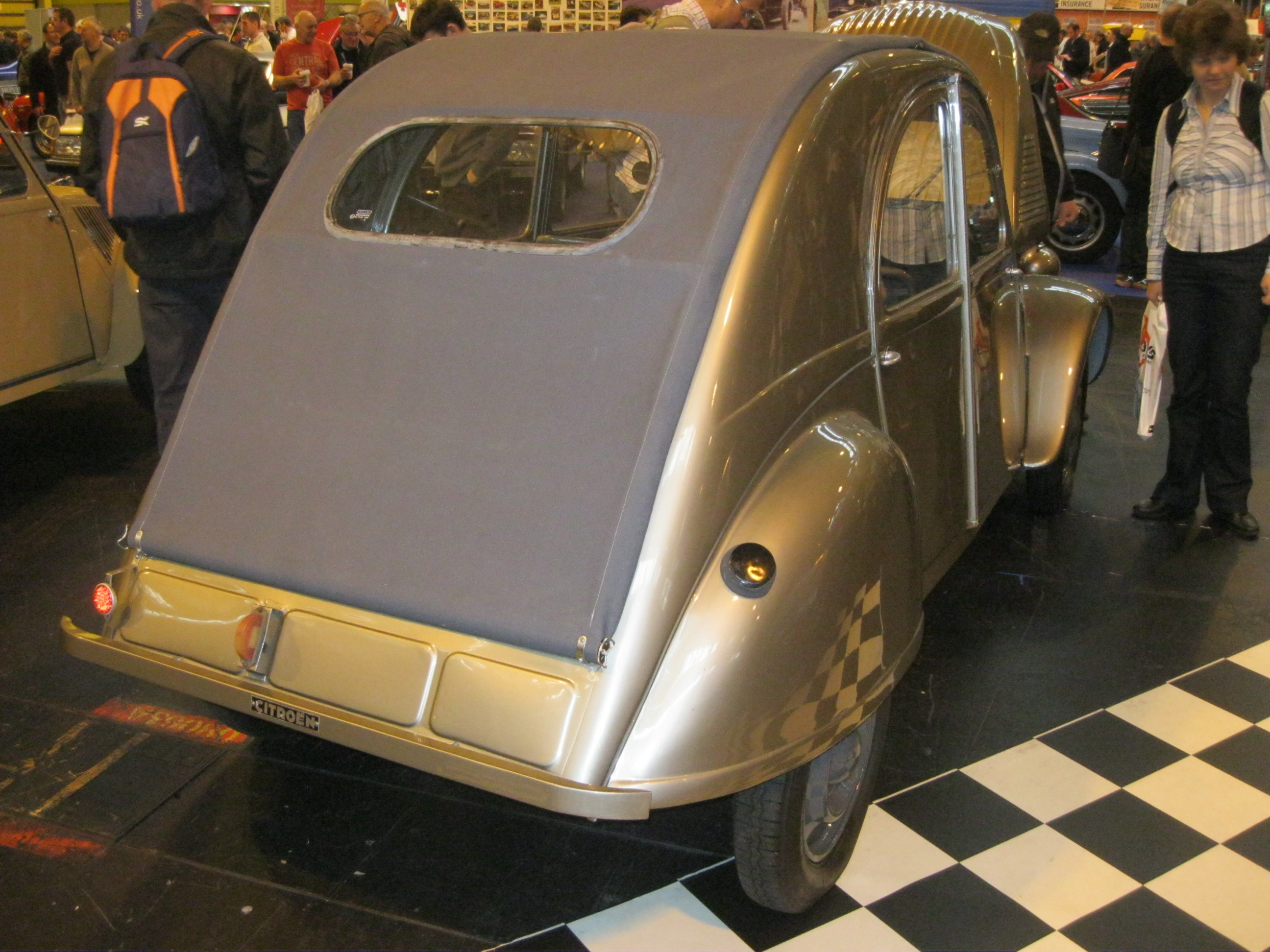
Early 2CV sedan has a canvas trunk, as well as canvas roof.

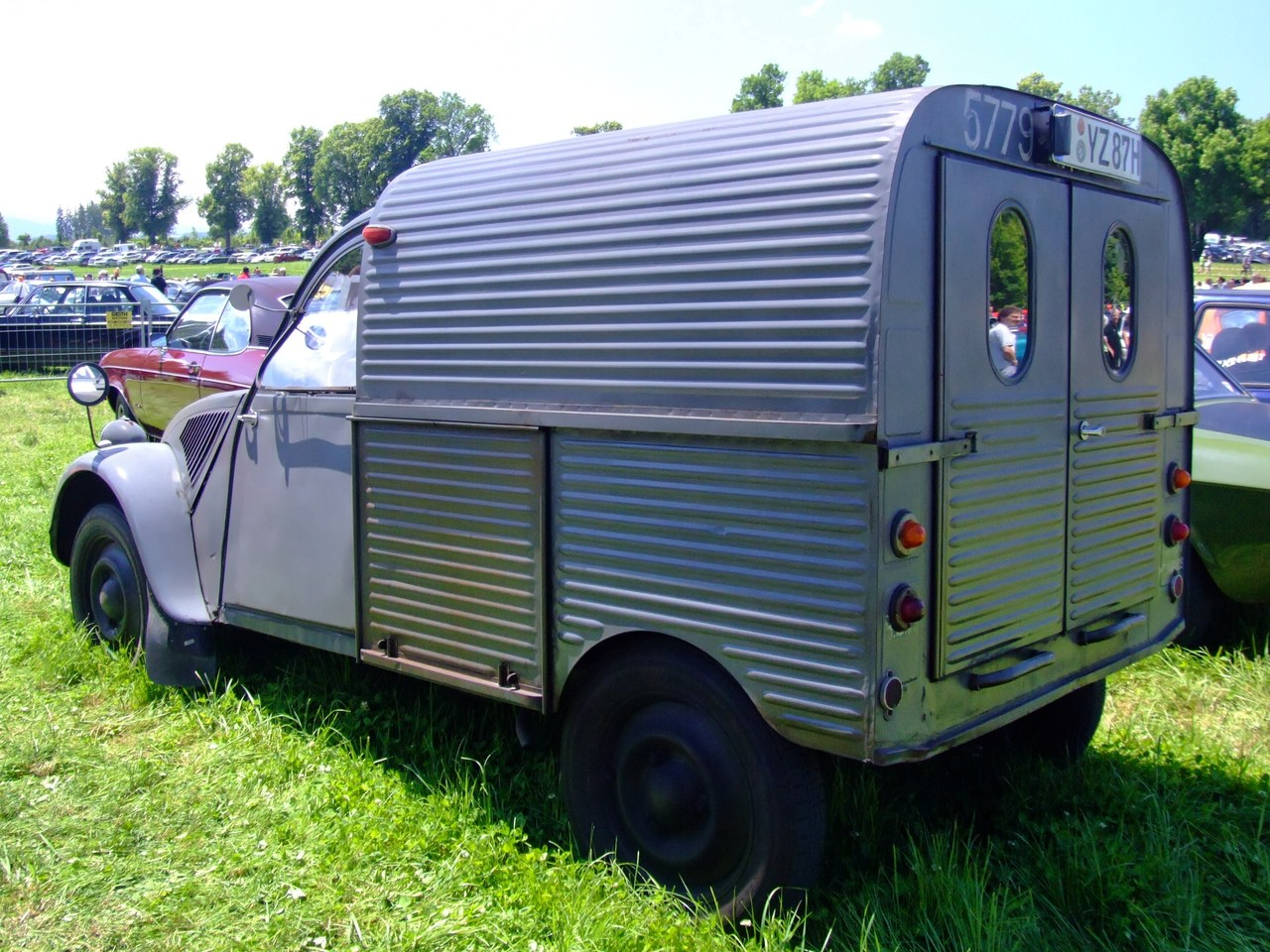
Early AZU fourgonnette rear

Citroën unveiled the car at the Paris Salon on 7 October 1948. The car on display was nearly identical to the 2CV type A that would be sold the next year, but it lacked an electric starter, the addition of which was decided the day before the opening of the Salon, replacing the pull cord starter. The canvas roof could be rolled completely open. The Type A had one stop light, and was available only in grey. The fuel level was checked with a dipstick/measuring rod, and the speedometer was attached to the windscreen pillar. The only other instrument was an ammeter.

=== Production ===
==== 1949–1959 ====
In 1949, the first delivered 2CV type A was 375 cc, 6.6 kW (9 hp), with a 65 km/h (40 mph) top speed, only one tail light and windscreen wiper with speed shaft drive; the wiper speed was dependent on the driving speed. There was no fuel gauge; Citroën provided a dipstick below the petrol filler cap. The 2CV was the first car designed around and released with radial tires.

The car was heavily criticised by the motoring press and became the butt of French comedians for a short while. The British Autocar correspondent wrote that the 2CV "...is the work of a designer who has kissed the lash of austerity with almost masochistic fervour". One American motoring journalist quipped, "Does it come with a can opener?"

Despite critics, Citroën was flooded with customer orders at the show. The car had a great impact on the lives of the low-income segment of the population in France. The 2CV was a commercial success: within months of it going on sale, there was a three-year waiting list, which soon increased to five years. At the time a second-hand 2CV was more expensive than a new one because the buyer did not have to wait. Production was increased from 876 units in 1949 to 6,196 units in 1950.

Grudging respect began to emanate from the international press: towards the end of 1951 the opinion appeared in Germany's recently launched Auto, Motor und Sport magazine that, despite its "ugliness and primitiveness" ("Häßlichkeit und Primitivität"), the 2CV was a "highly interesting" ("hochinteressantes") car.

In 1950, Pierre-Jules Boulanger was killed in a car crash on the main road from Clermont-Ferrand (the home of Michelin) to Paris.

In 1951, the 2CV received an ignition lock and a lockable driver's door. Production reached 100 cars a week. By the end of 1951 production totalled 16,288. Citroën introduced the 2CV Fourgonnette panel van. The "Weekend" version of the van had collapsible, removable rear seating and rear side windows, enabling a tradesman to use it as a family vehicle on the weekend as well as for business in the week.

By 1952, production had reached more than 21,000 with export markets earning foreign currency taking precedence. Boulanger's policy, which continued after his death, was: "Priority is given to those who have to travel by car because of their work and for whom ordinary cars are too expensive to buy." Cars were sold preferentially to country vets, doctors, midwives, priests and small farmers. In 1954, the speedometer got a light for night driving. In 1955, the 2CV side repeaters were added above and behind the rear doors. It was now also available with 425 cc (AZ), 9.2 kW (12.5 hp) and a top speed of 80 km/h (50 mph). In 1957, a heating and ventilation system was installed. The colour of the steering wheel changed from black to grey. The mirrors and the rear window were enlarged. The bonnet was decorated with a longitudinal strip of aluminium (AZL). In September 1957, the model AZLP (P for porte de malle, "boot lid"), appeared with a boot lid panel; previously the soft top had to be opened at the bottom to get to the boot. In 1958, a Belgian Citroën plant produced a higher quality version of the car (AZL3). It had a third side window, not available in the normal version and improved details.

==== 1960–1969 ====
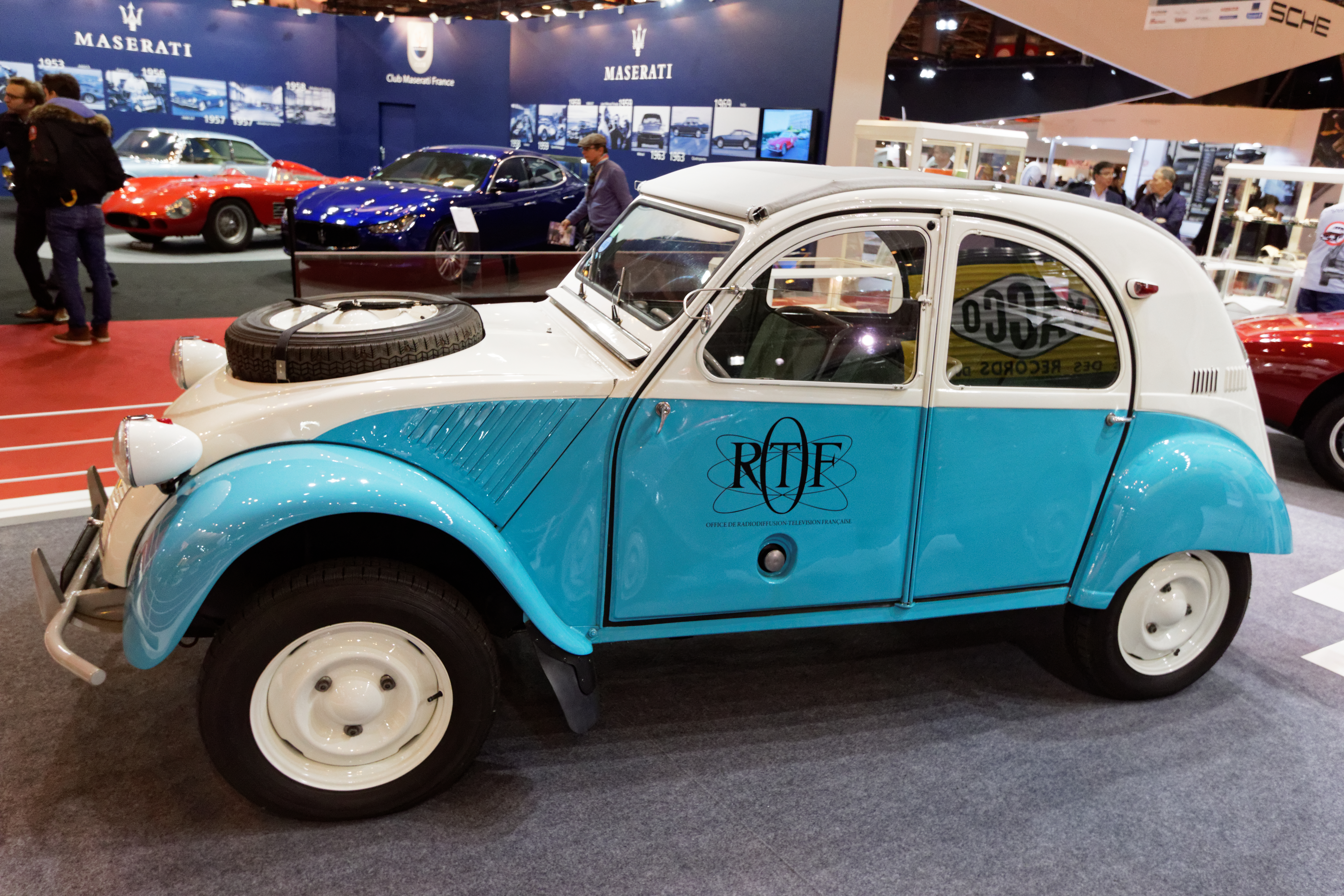
1961 Citroën 2CV 4×4 Sahara

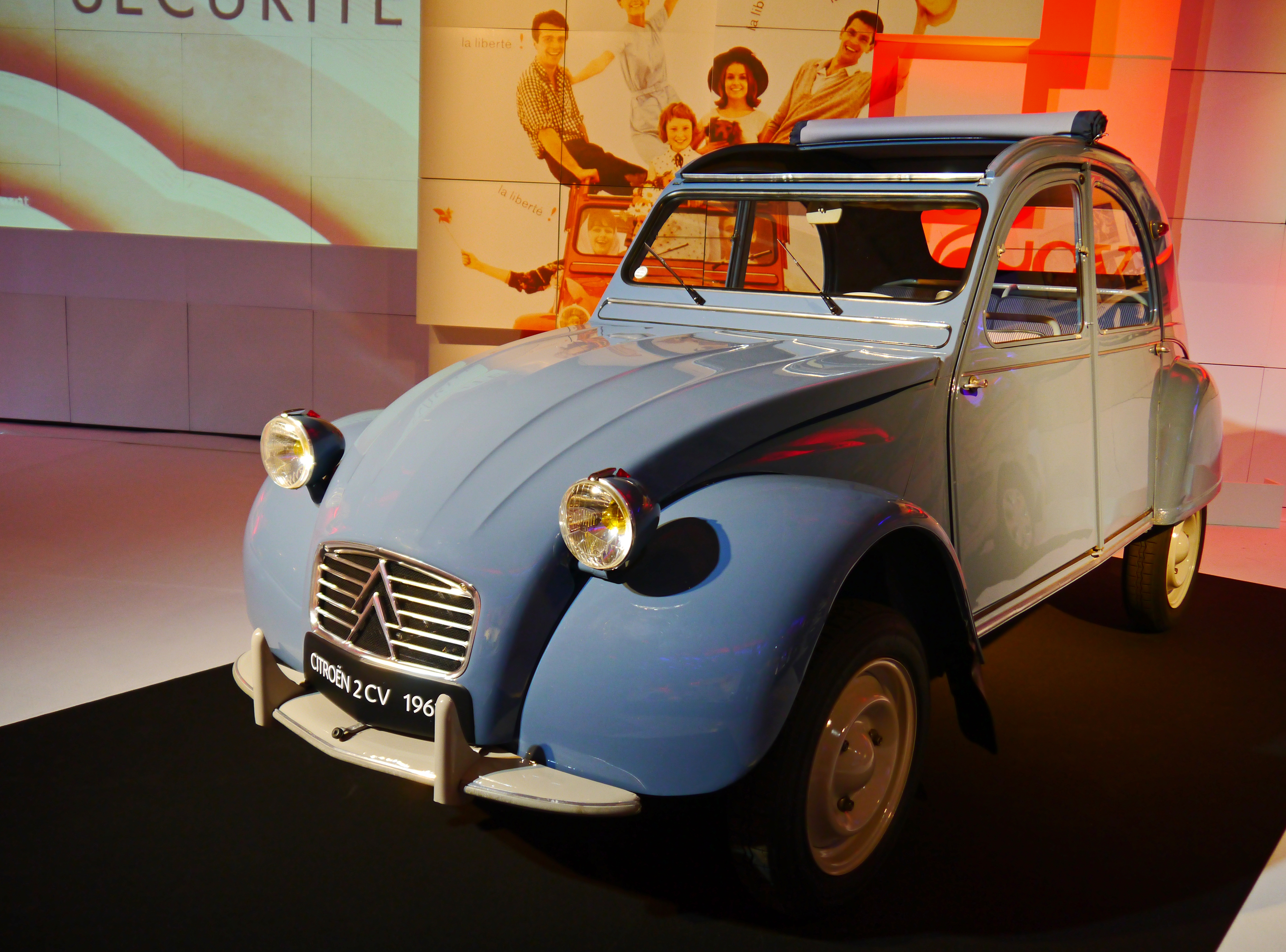
1961 2CV sedan with canvas roof rolled back – suicide doors

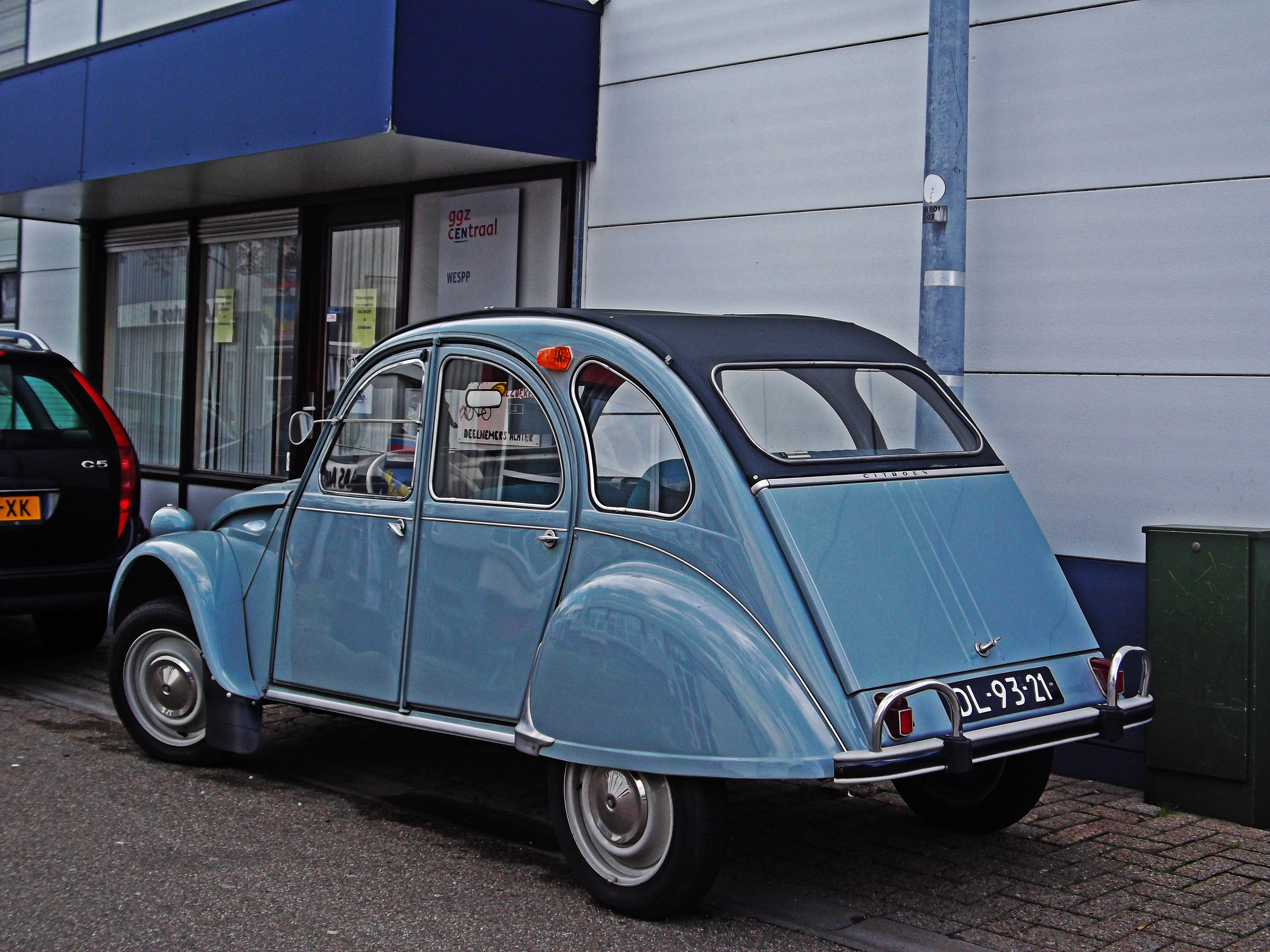
1966 2CV AZAM 6 sedan – conventional opening front doors

In 1960, the production of the 375 cc engine ended. The corrugated metal bonnet was replaced by a five-rib glossy cover. Simultaneously, the grille was slightly modified (flatter shape with a curved top edge).Rectangular turn signals were integrated to the front wings on the AZAM export model; these became round on post-1970 cars when indicators were fitted to the rear of the car too. As a result the flashers disappeared from their traditional home high on the rear three quarter panel.

The 2 CV 4×4 2CV Sahara appeared in December 1960. This had an additional engine-transmission unit in the rear, mounted the other way around and driving the rear wheels. For the second engine there was a separate push-button starter and choke. With a gearstick between the front seats, both transmissions were operated simultaneously. For the two engines, there were separate petrol tanks under the front seats. The filler neck sat in the front doors. Both engines (and hence axles) could be operated independently. The spare wheel was mounted on the bonnet. The car had ample off-road capability, but at twice the price of the standard 2CV. 694 were produced until 1968 and one more in 1971. Many were used by the Swiss Post as a delivery vehicle. Today they are highly collectible.

Also in 1960, the corrugated Citroën H Van style "ripple bonnet" of convex swages was replaced (except for the Sahara), with one using six larger concave swages and looked similar until the end of production. The 2CV had suicide doors in front from 1948 to 1964, replaced with front hinged doors from 1965 to 1990.

In 1961, Citroën launched a new model based on the 2CV chassis, with a four-door sedan body and a reverse rake rear window: the Citroën Ami. In 1962, the engine power was increased to 10 kW (14 hp) and top speed to 85 km/h (53 mph). A sunroof was installed. In 1963, the engine power was increased to 13 kW (18 hp). An electric wiper motor replaced the drive on the speedometer. The ammeter was replaced by a charging indicator light. The speedometer was moved from the window frame into the dash. Instead of a dipstick/measuring rod, a fuel gauge was introduced.

Director of publicity Claude Puech came up with humorous and inventive marketing campaigns. Robert Delpire of the Delpire Agency was responsible for the brochures. Ad copy came from Jacques Wolgensinger Director of PR at Citroën. Wolgensinger was responsible for the youth oriented "Raids", 2CV Cross, rallies, the use of "Tin-Tin", and the slogan "More than just a car—a way of life". A range of colours was introduced, starting with Glacier Blue in 1959, then yellow in 1960. In the 1960s, 2CV production caught up with demand. In 1966, the 2CV got a third side window, this window made them look slightly bigger in size. In February 1965, Citroën Belgium introduced the 3CV AZAM6 which featured the 602 cc, 17 kW (23 hp) Ami 6 engine and the Ami's improved chassis. This version was manufactured until October 1967 and was also exported to certain continental markets although it was never offered in its native France.

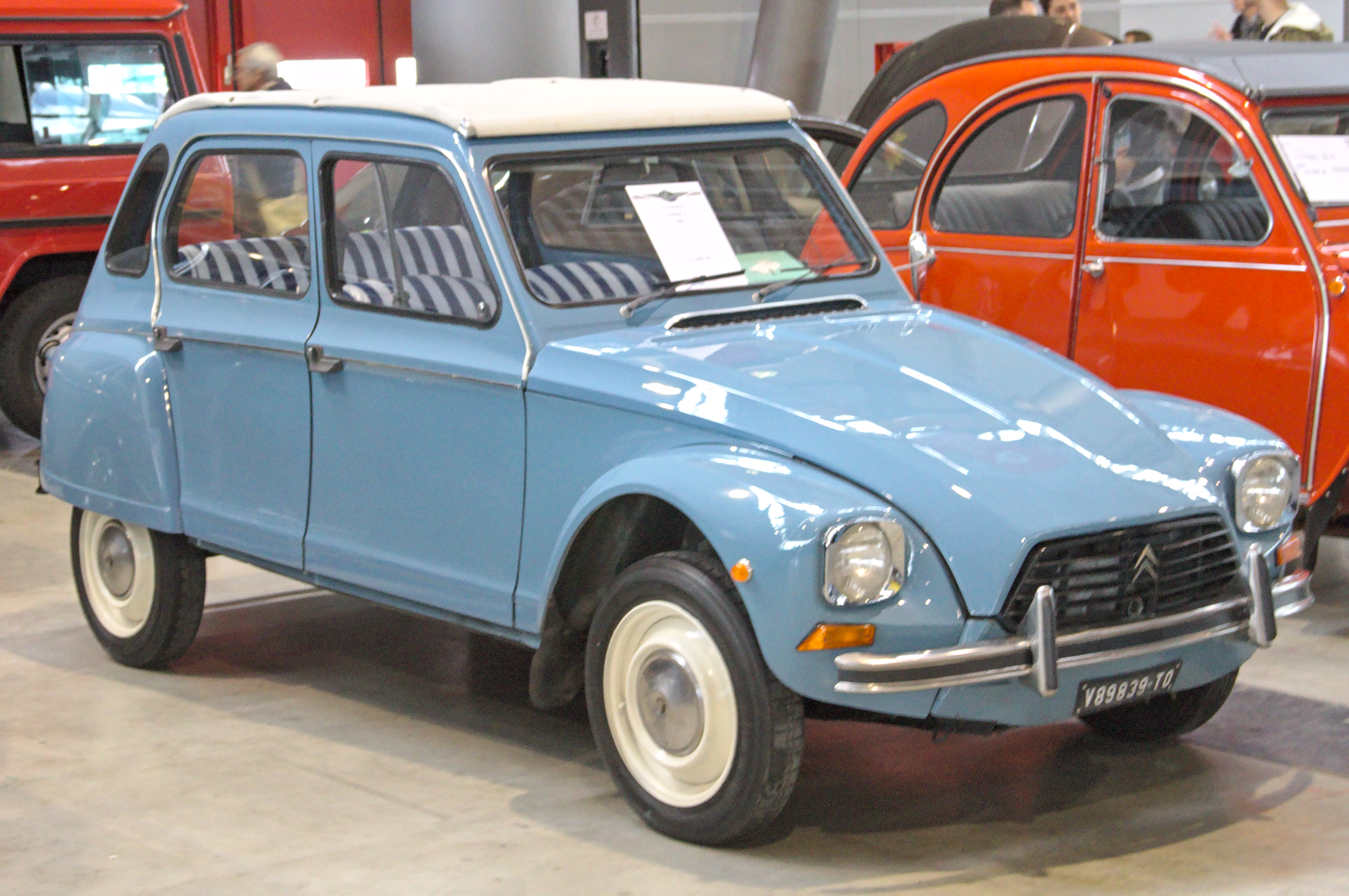
The Dyane's styling is more angular compared to a 2CV (behind it).

In 1967, Citroën launched the new Dyane model, a direct derivative, based on the 2CV chassis, with an updated but similar, utilitarian body, distinguished by a hatchback that boosted practicality; (a hatchback kit was available from Citroën dealers for the 2CV and aftermarket kits were available). This was in response to competition by the Renault 4. The exterior is more modern and distinguished by the integrated lights in the wings and bodywork. Between 1967 and 1983, about 1.4 million Dyanes were built. The Dyane was a more sophisticated 2CV and originally planned to supersede it, but 2CV production continued by its side and ultimately the 2CV outlived the Dyane by seven years. Citroën also developed the Méhari off-roader.

From 1965, the car was offered in some countries, at extra cost, with the flat-twin engine size increased to 602 cc (36.7 cu in), although for many years the smaller 425 cc (25.9 cu in) engine continued to be available in France and export markets where engine size determined car tax levels. This was replaced by an updated 435 cc (26.5 cu in) engine in February 1970.

==== 1970–1979 ====
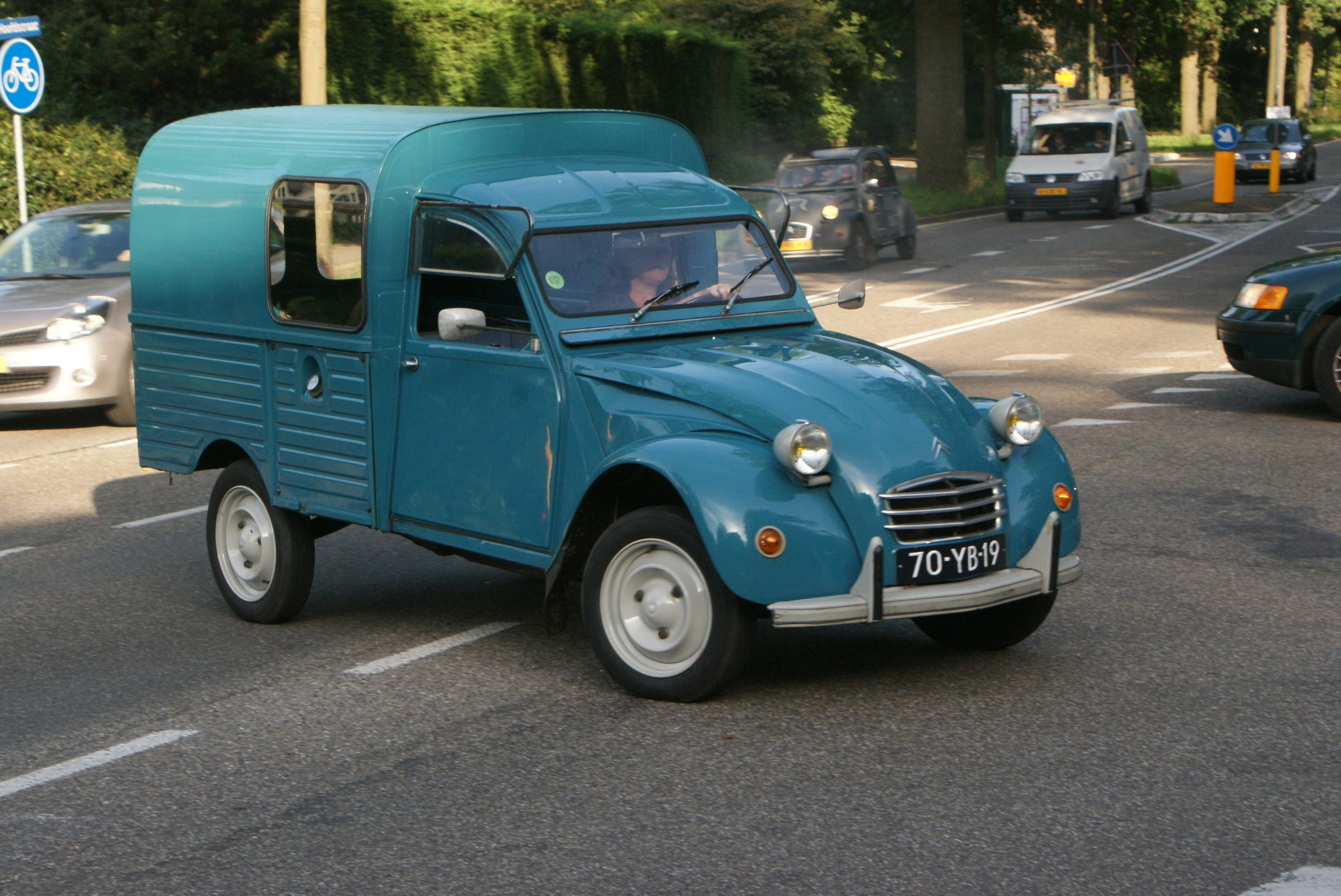
1974 Citroën AK 400 Fourgonette

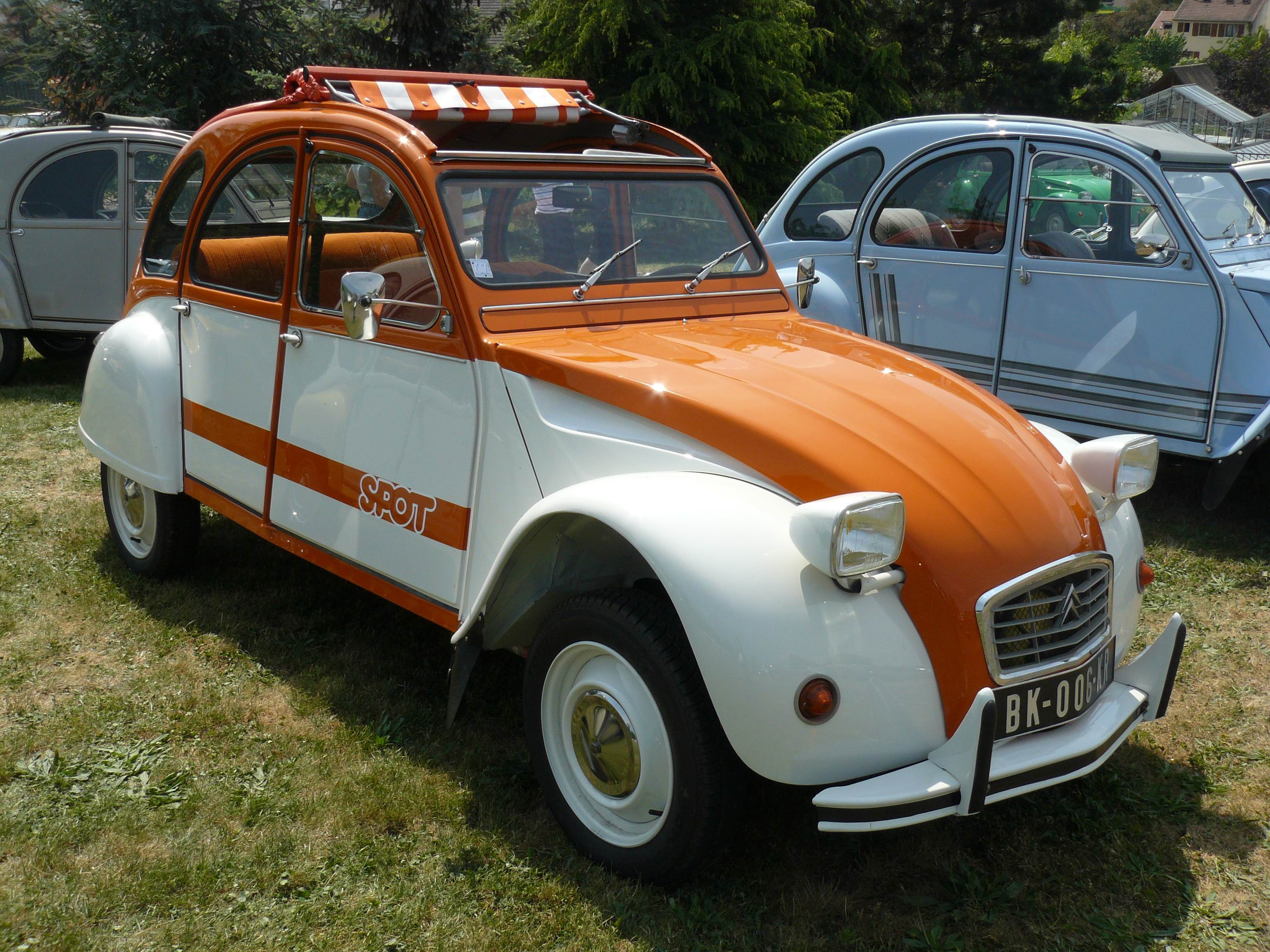
1976 'Spot' sedan, with rectangular headlights

In 1970, the car gained rear light units from the Citroën Ami 6. (602 cc) models. From then on, only two series were produced: the 2CV 4 (AZKB) with 435 cc and the 2CV 6 (AZKA) with 602 cc displacement. All 2CVs from this date can run on unleaded fuel. 1970s cars featured rectangular headlights from 1975, except the Spécial model. In 1971, the front bench seat was replaced with two individual seats. In 1972, 2CVs were fitted with standard three-point seat belts. In 1973, new seat covers, a padded single-spoke steering wheel and ashtrays were introduced.

The highest annual production was in 1974. Sales of the 2CV were reinvigorated by the 1974 oil crisis. The 2CV after this time became as much a youth lifestyle statement as a basic functional form of transport. This renewed popularity was encouraged by the Citroën "Raid" intercontinental endurance rallies of the 1970s where customers could participate by buying a new 2CV, fitted with a "P.O." kit (Pays d'Outre-mer—overseas countries), to cope with thousands of kilometres of very poor or off-road routes.

- 1970: Paris–Kabul: 1,300 young people, 500 2CVs, 16,500 km (10,300 miles) to Afghanistan and back.
- 1971: Paris–Persepolis: 500 2CVs 13,500 km (8,400 miles) to Iran and back.
- 1973: Raid Afrique, 60 2CVs 8,000 km (5,000 miles) from Abidjan to Tunis, the Atlantic capital of Ivory Coast through the Sahara (the Ténéré desert section was unmapped and had previously been barred to cars), to the Mediterranean capital of Tunisia.

The Paris to Persepolis rally was the most famous. The Citroën "2CV Cross" circuit/off-road races were very popular in Europe.

Because of new emission standards, in 1975, power was reduced from 21 to 18 kW (28 to 25 hp). The round headlights were replaced by square ones, still adjustable in height. A new plastic grille was fitted.

In July 1975, a base model called the 2CV Spécial was introduced with the 435 cc engine. Between 1975 and 1990 under the name of AZKB "2CV Spécial" a drastically reduced trim basic version was sold, at first only in yellow and with an untreated black roof. Slimmer bumpers with stick-on tape rather than plastic strips and no overriders were fitted. It also had the earlier round headlights, last fitted in 1974. In order to keep the price as low as possible, Citroën removed the third side window, the ashtray and virtually all trim from the car, while that which remained was greatly simplified, such as simple vinyl-clad door cards and exposed door catches rather than the plastic moulded trims found on the 2CV Club. Other 2CVs shared their instruments with the Dyane and H-Van but the Spécial had a much smaller square speedometer also incorporating the fuel gauge, originally fitted to the 2CV in the mid-1960s and then discontinued. The model also had a revised (and cheaper-to-make) plastic version of the 1960s two-spoke steering wheel instead of the one-spoke item from the Dyane, as found on the Club. From the 1978 Paris Motor Show the Spécial regained third side windows and was available in red and white. Beginning in mid-1979 the 602 cc engine was installed. In June 1981, the Spécial E arrived. This model had a standard centrifugal clutch and particularly low urban fuel consumption.

==== 1980–1990 ====
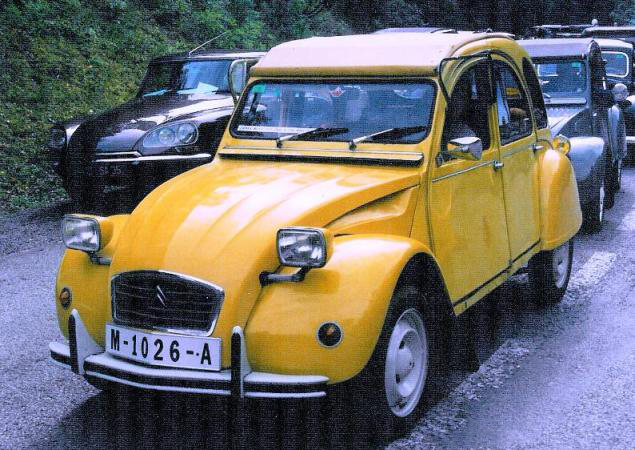
2CV 007 (as used in For Your Eyes Only)

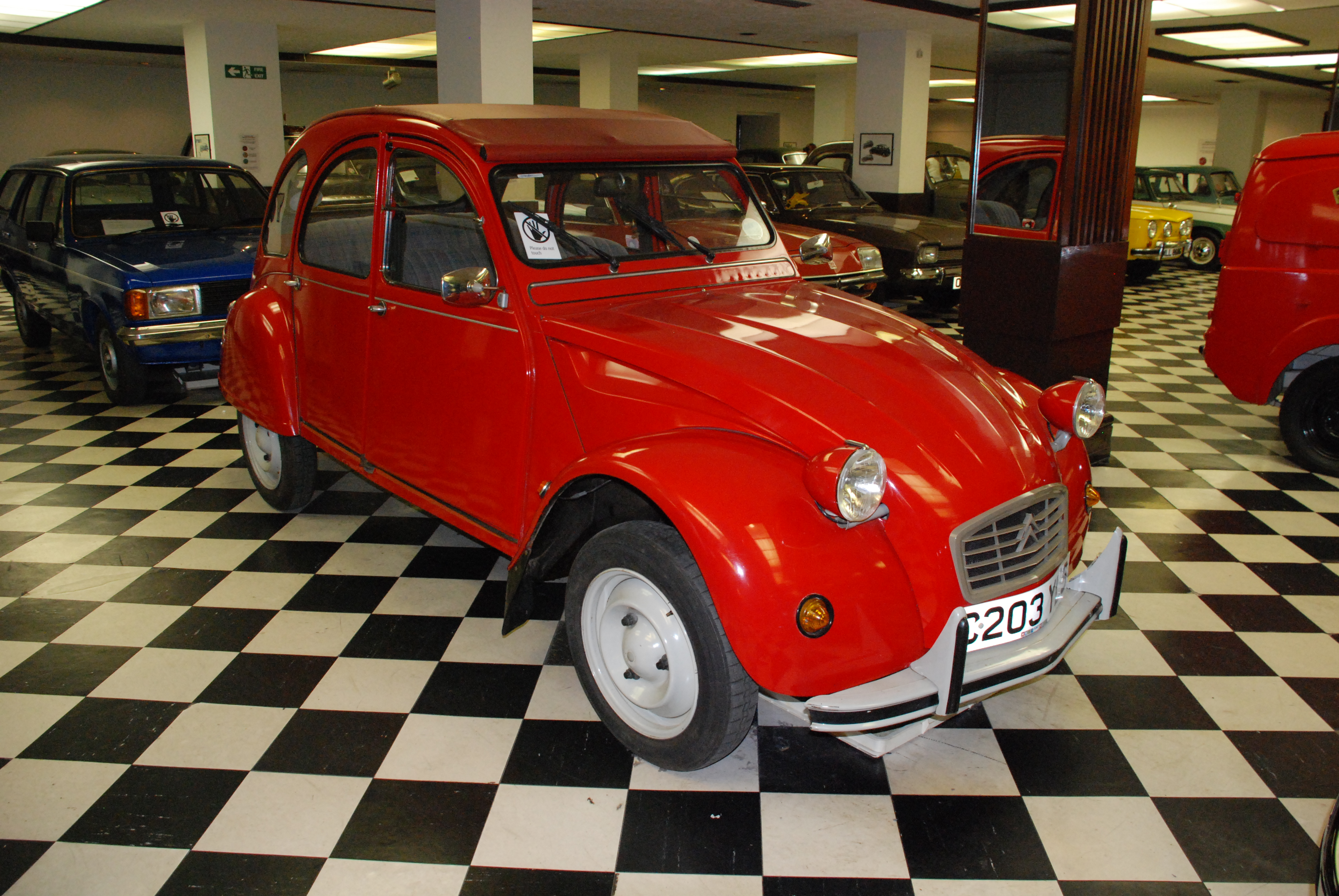
1980s 2CV6 Spécial

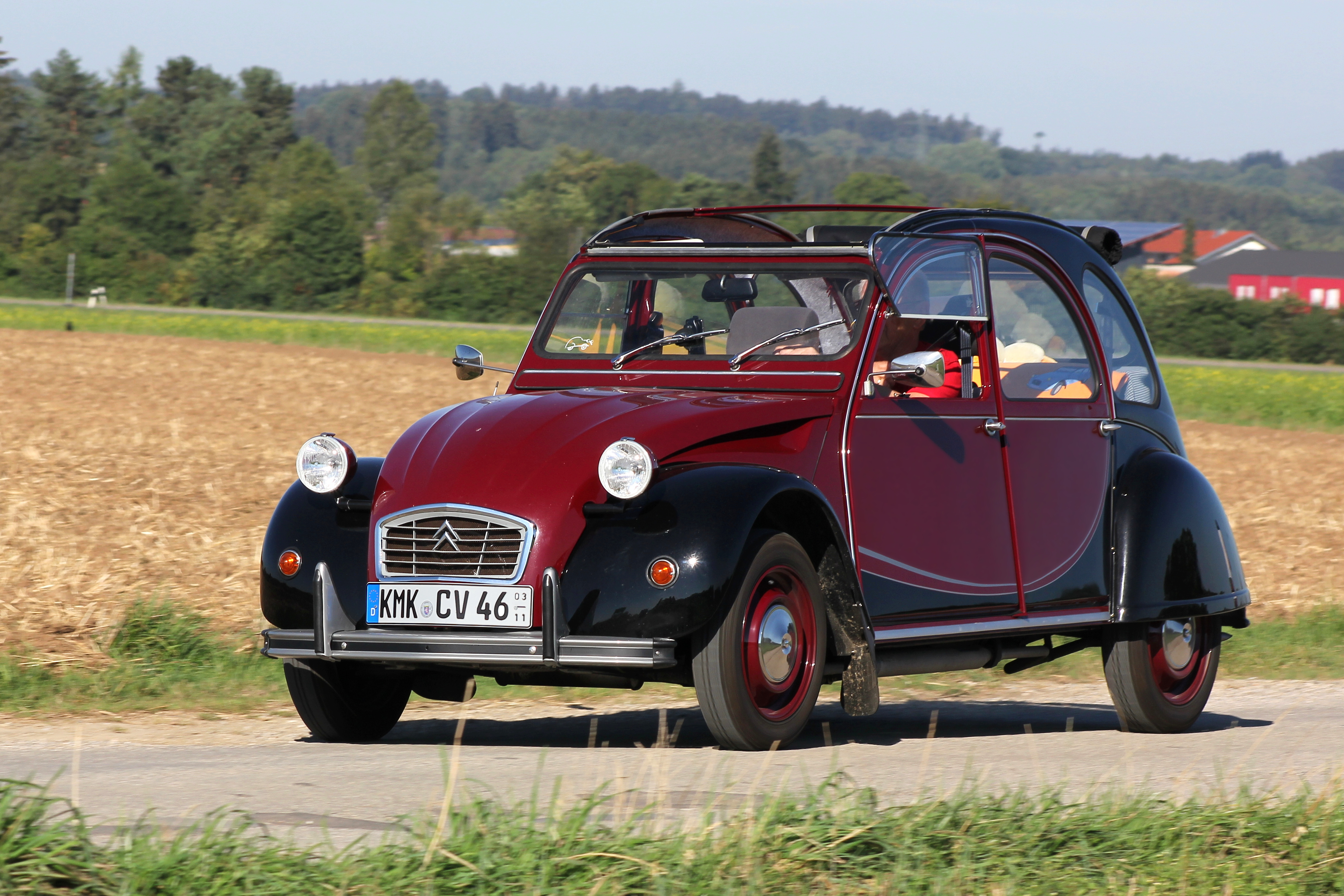
Citroën 2CV Charleston photographed in front of Bad Wörishofen

By 1980, the boost to 2CV sales across Europe delivered by the 1973 Energy Crisis had begun to wear off and there was a whole new generation of superminis and economy cars available from European and Japanese manufacturers. Citroën itself now had the Visa available which launched in 1978. Peak annual production for 2CVs reached 163,143 cars in 1974 but by 1980 this had dropped to 89,994 and by 1983 would stand at just 59,673. Nonetheless, the car remained profitable for PSA to produce on account of its tooling and set-up costs being amortised many years before and it could share major parts with more popular or profitable models such as the Visa and Acadiane. As part of this rationalisation in 1981, the Spécial was fitted as standard with the 602 cc engine, although the 435 cc version remained available to special order in some European countries until stocks were used up.

Also in 1981, a yellow 2CV6 was driven by James Bond (Roger Moore) in the film For Your Eyes Only. The car in the film was fitted with the flat-four engine from a Citroën GS which more than doubled the power. In one scene, the ultra-light 2CV tips over and is quickly righted by hand. Citroën launched a special edition 2CV "007" to coincide with the film, it was fitted with the standard engine and painted yellow with "007" on the front doors and fake bullet hole stickers.

In 1982, all 2CV models got inboard front disc brakes which also used LHM fluid instead of conventional brake fluid—the same as was found in the larger Citroën models with hydropneumatic suspension.

In late 1986, Citroën introduced the Visa's replacement, the AX. This was widely regarded as a superior car to the Visa and took many of the remaining 2CV sales in France following its introduction. From 1986 to 1987 2CV production fell by 20 per cent to just 43,255 cars. Of that total over 12,500 went to West Germany and 7212 went to the UK. France was now the third-largest market for 2CVs, taking 7045 cars that year. It was estimated that Citroën was now selling the 2CV at a loss in the French market, but that it was still profitable in other European countries. The peak of 2CV sales in the United Kingdom would be reached in 1986, thanks to the introduction of the popular Dolly special edition (see below)—7520 new 2CVs were registered in Britain that year. This year saw the discontinuation of the Club which was by then the only 2CV model to retain the rectangular headlamps. This left the Spécial as the only regular 2CV model, alongside the more fashion-orientated Dolly, Charleston and the other special editions.

In 1988, production ended in France after 40 years. The factory at Levallois-Perret had been the global centre for 2CV production since 1948 but was outdated, inefficient and widely criticised for its poor working conditions. The last French-built 2CV was made on February 25. In recognition of the event, the last 2CV built at Levallois was a basic Spécial in a non-standard grey colour—the same shade as worn by the very first 2CVs. Production of the 2CV would continue at the smaller-capacity but more modern Mangualde plant in Portugal until 1990.

In 1989, a number of European nations voluntarily introduced the first European emission standards ahead of the legal deadline of July 1992. This forced the 2CV's withdrawal from sale in Austria, Denmark, Italy, Spain, Sweden, Switzerland and the Netherlands, the latter one of the car's largest remaining markets. That year, the three leading markets for the 2CV were West Germany (7866), France (5231) and the UK (3200).

The last 2CV, a specially-prepared Charleston model, was built at Mangualde on 27 July 1990. Only 42,365 2CVs were built in Portugal in the two years following the end of French production.

Portuguese-built cars, especially those from when production was winding down, have a reputation in the UK for being much less well-made and more prone to corrosion than those made in France. According to Citroën, the Portuguese plant was more up-to-date than the one in Levallois near Paris and Portuguese 2CV manufacturing was to higher-quality standards.

As of October 2016, 3,025 remained in service in the UK.

==== Special edition saloon models ====
The special edition models began with the 1976 SPOT model and continued in with the 1980 Charleston, inspired by Art-Deco two colour styles 1920s Citroën model colour schemes (initially Grey/Black, Maroon/Black and Yellow/Black). In 1981 the 007 arrived. In 1983 the 2CV Beachcomber arrived in the United Kingdom; it was known as "France 3" in France or "Transat" in other continental European markets—Citroën sponsored the French America's Cup yacht entry of that year. In 1986 there was the Cocorico. This means "cock-a-doodle-doo" and tied in with France's entry in the 1986 World Cup. "Le Coq Gaulois" or Gallic rooster is an unofficial national symbol of France. In 1987 came the Bamboo, followed by the 1988 Perrier in association with the mineral water company.

The Charleston, having been presented in October 1980 as a one-season "special edition" was incorporated into the regular range in July 1981 in response to its "extraordinary success". By changing the carburettor to achieve 21 kW (29 hp), a top speed of 115 km/h (71 mph) was achieved. Other changes were a new rear-view mirror and inboard disc brakes at the front wheels.

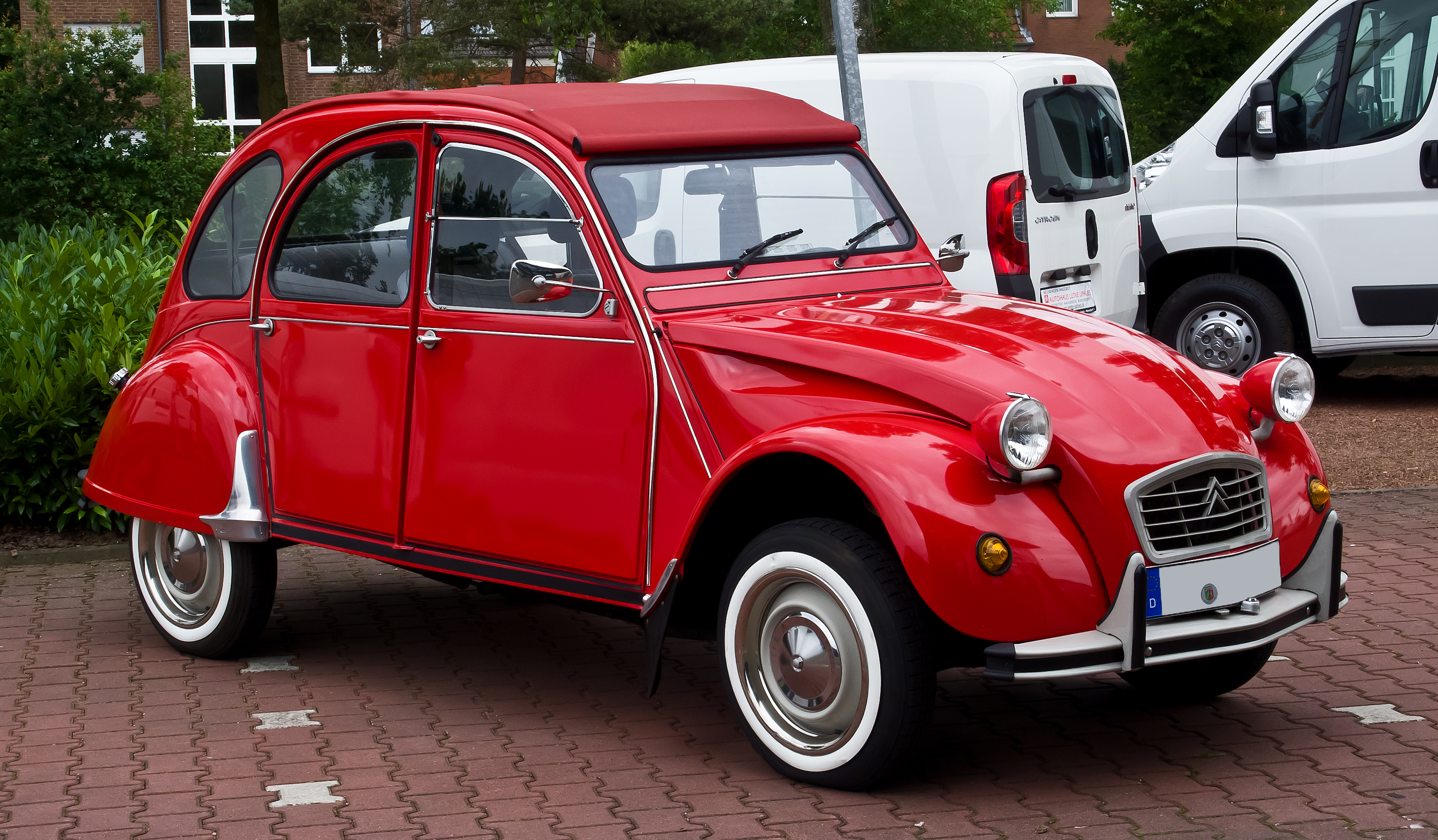
Citroën 2CV6 Club

The Dolly special edition was introduced in March 1985, using bright two-tone colour schemes with a similar Art Deco style as the more subdued Charleston. In its name, style and marketing the Dolly was particularly aimed at female car buyers, as in the mid-1980s research showed that 40% of 2CV buyers were women. The original colour combinations offered were grey/white, grey/red and grey/yellow. All these cars were quickly sold out, so a second series of Dolly models were produced in September in white/red, white/green and beige/maroon. With demand for these models still high Citroën made the Dolly a permanent fixture in the 2CV range. While the first two series had, like the other special editions, been based on the more luxurious Club model the production Dolly was based on the basic 2CV Spécial to provide a model priced between the Spécial and the Club. Colours offered on the Dolly from 1986 were white/red, beige/maroon and blue/beige. In many markets, including Germany and the UK, the Dolly was best-selling 2CV model, outselling all the other variants combined in some years. The Charleston continued as the range-topping model, but the yellow/black colour option was dropped from 1984. This meant that in the 1980s there was a range of four full models:

- Spécial
- Dolly (an improved version of the Spécial)
- Club (discontinued in 1987)
- Charleston (an improved version of the Club)

In Germany and Switzerland a special edition called "I Fly Bleifrei" ("I Fly Lead Free") was launched in 1986, painted in two-tone green. The name and color were a reference to this version's ability to use unleaded fuel instead of the then-normal leaded petrol and super unleaded. It was introduced mainly because of stricter emissions standards. In 1987 the German market received the all-green "Sausss-Ente" special edition (limited to 400 examples), this translates to "quick duck". It continued the I Fly Bleifrei's design theme and was decorated with a helmeted and goggled flying duck. Tongue-in-cheek, the period advertisements as well as the side graphics proudly showcased the car's 59.4-second 0–100 km/h (62 mph) acceleration time.

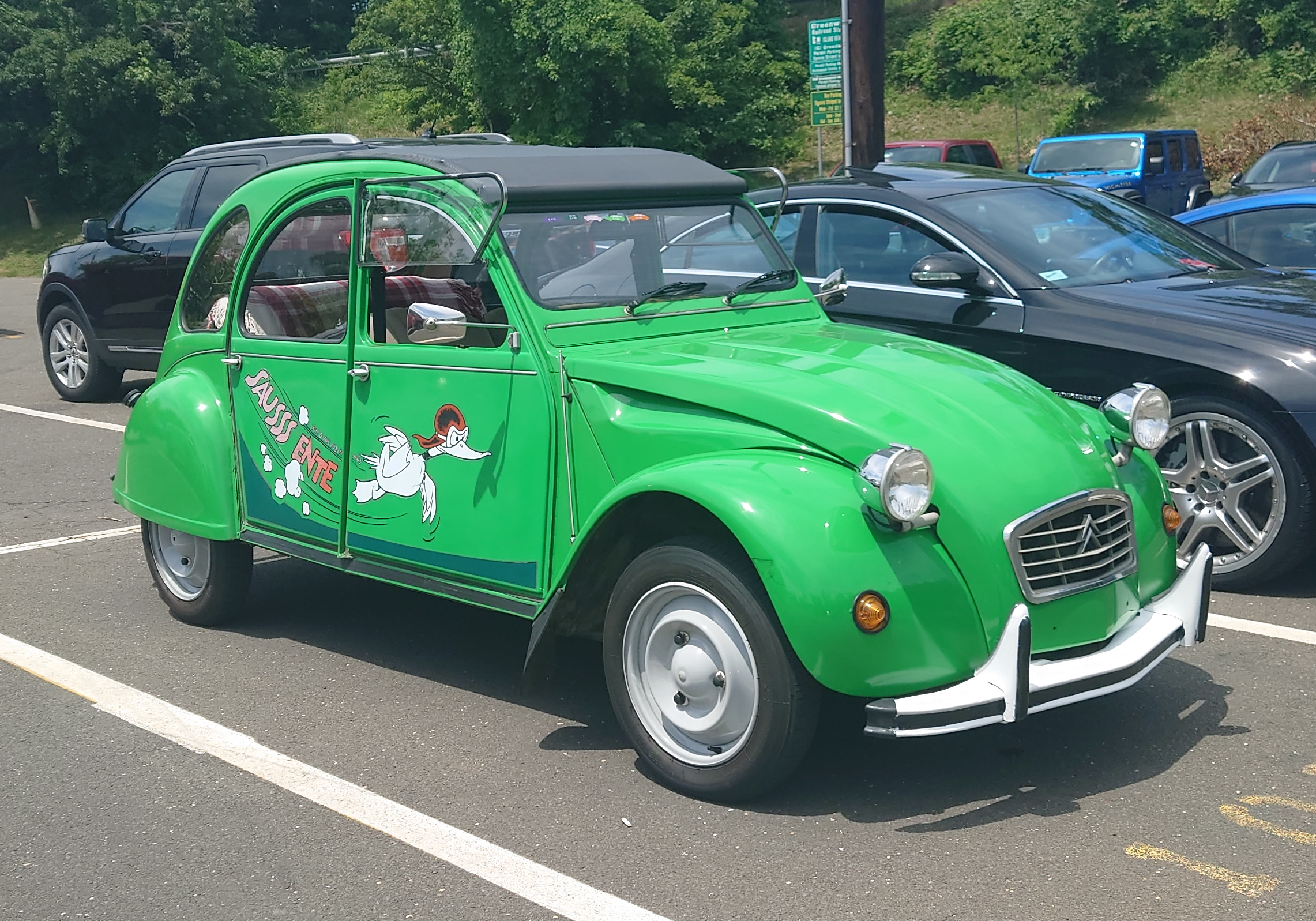
The front of a 1987 2CV Sausss-Ente

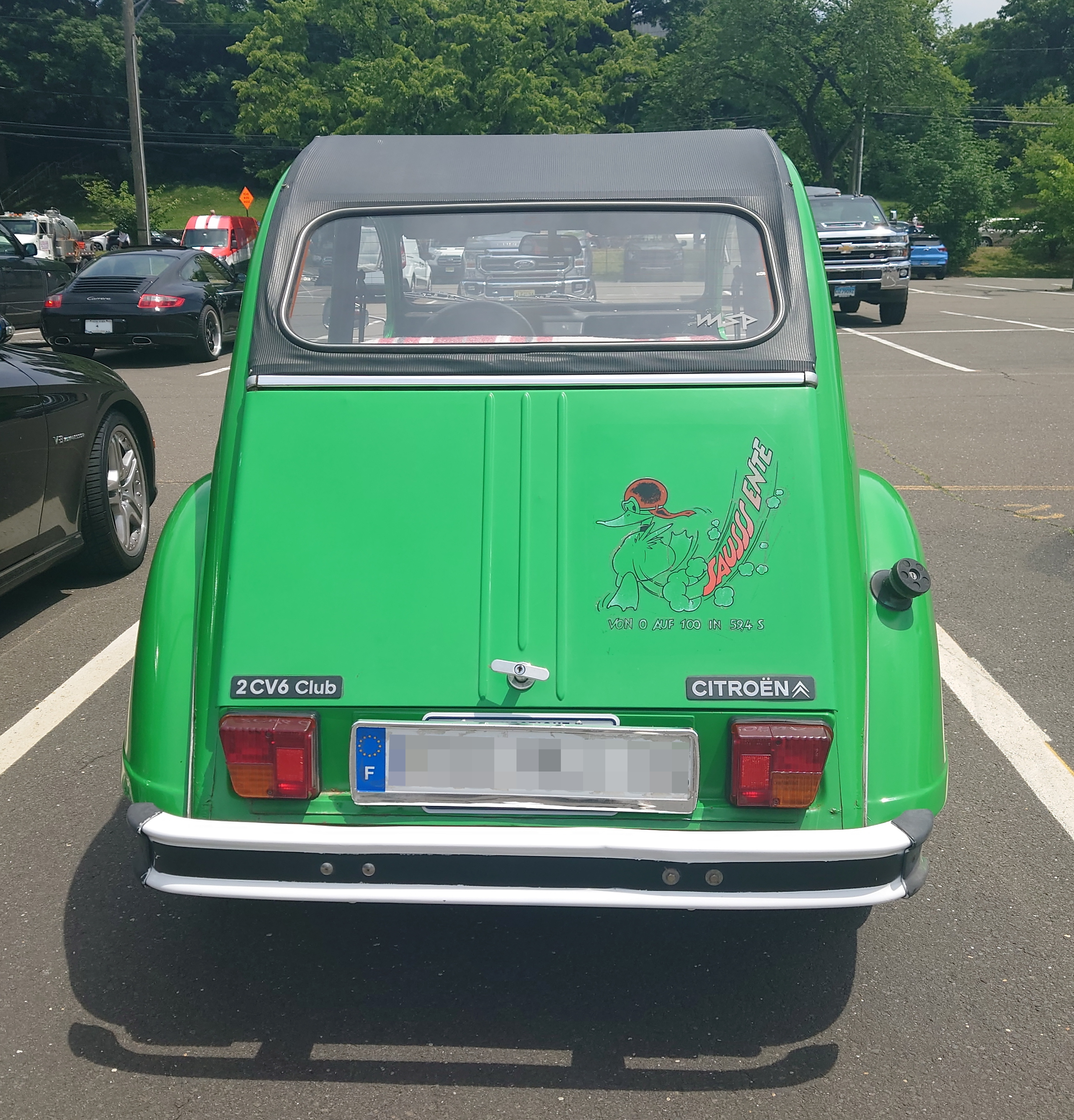
The rear of a 1987 2CV Sausss-Ente

== Export markets ==
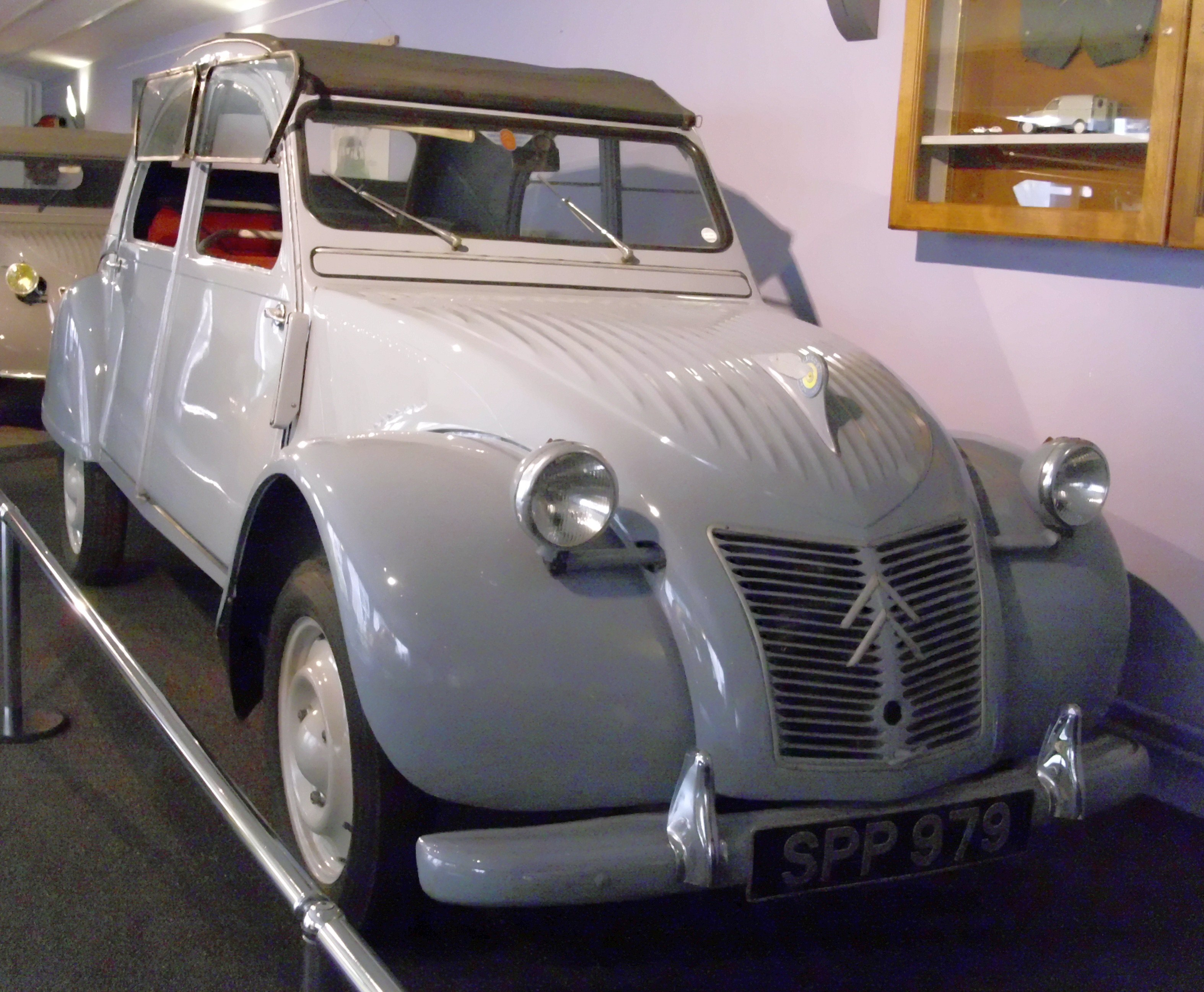
1953 Slough, UK built 2CV sedan – with fold-up rear windows

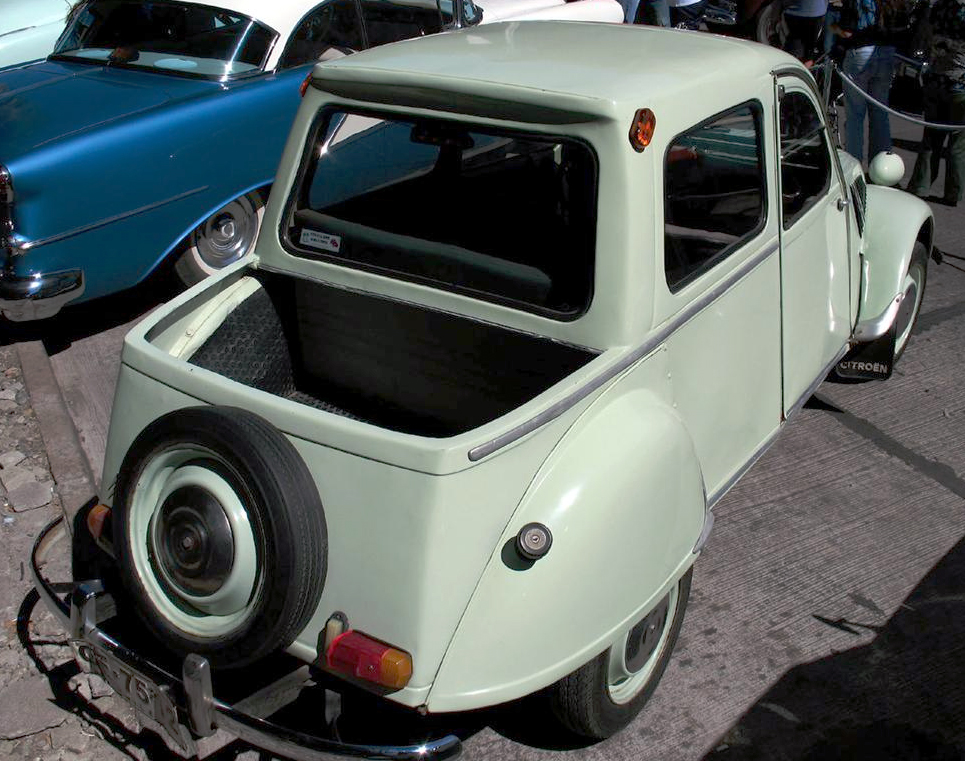
1961 13hp "Citroneta" pickup truck from Chile

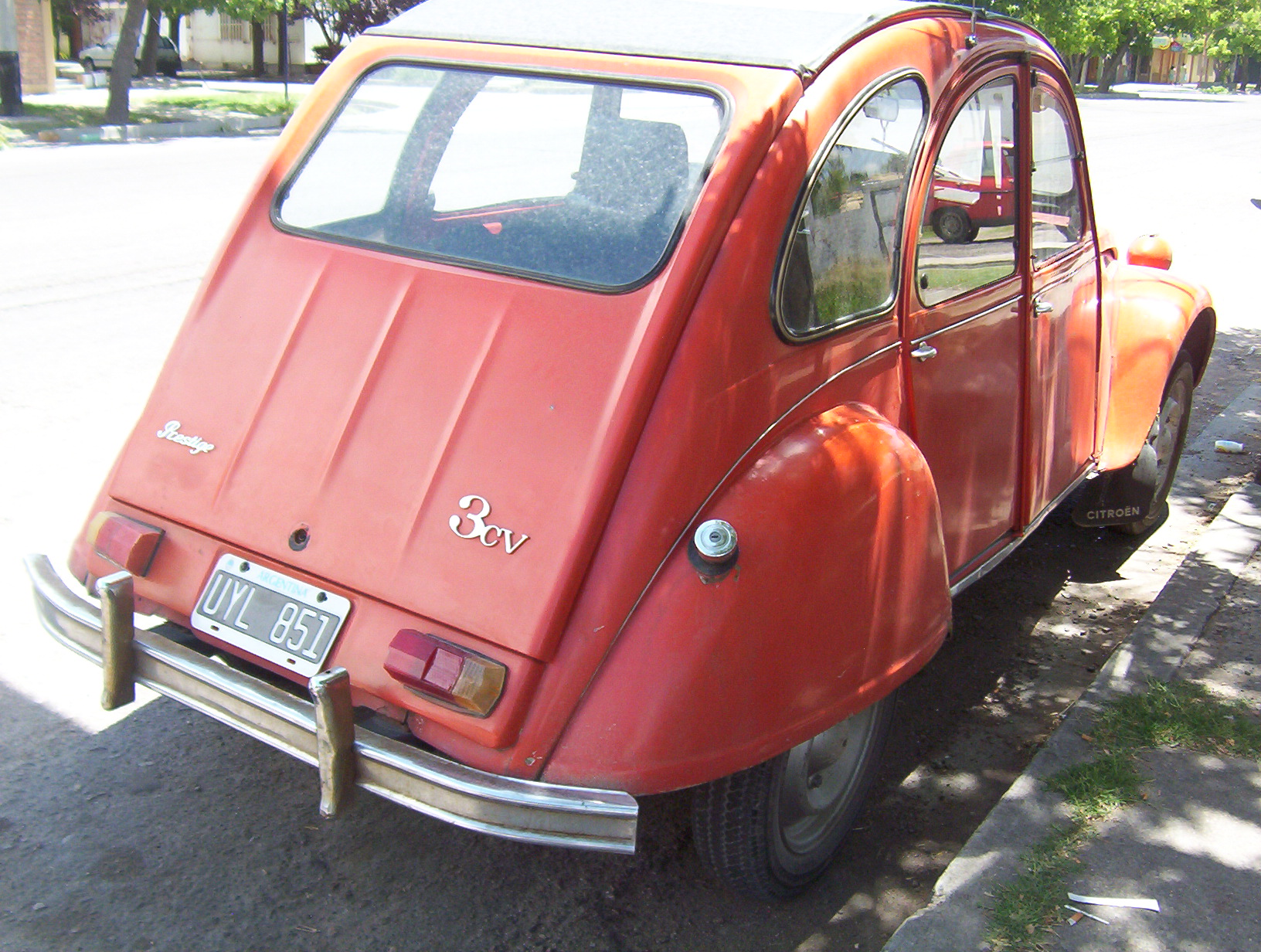
3CV hatchback in Argentina

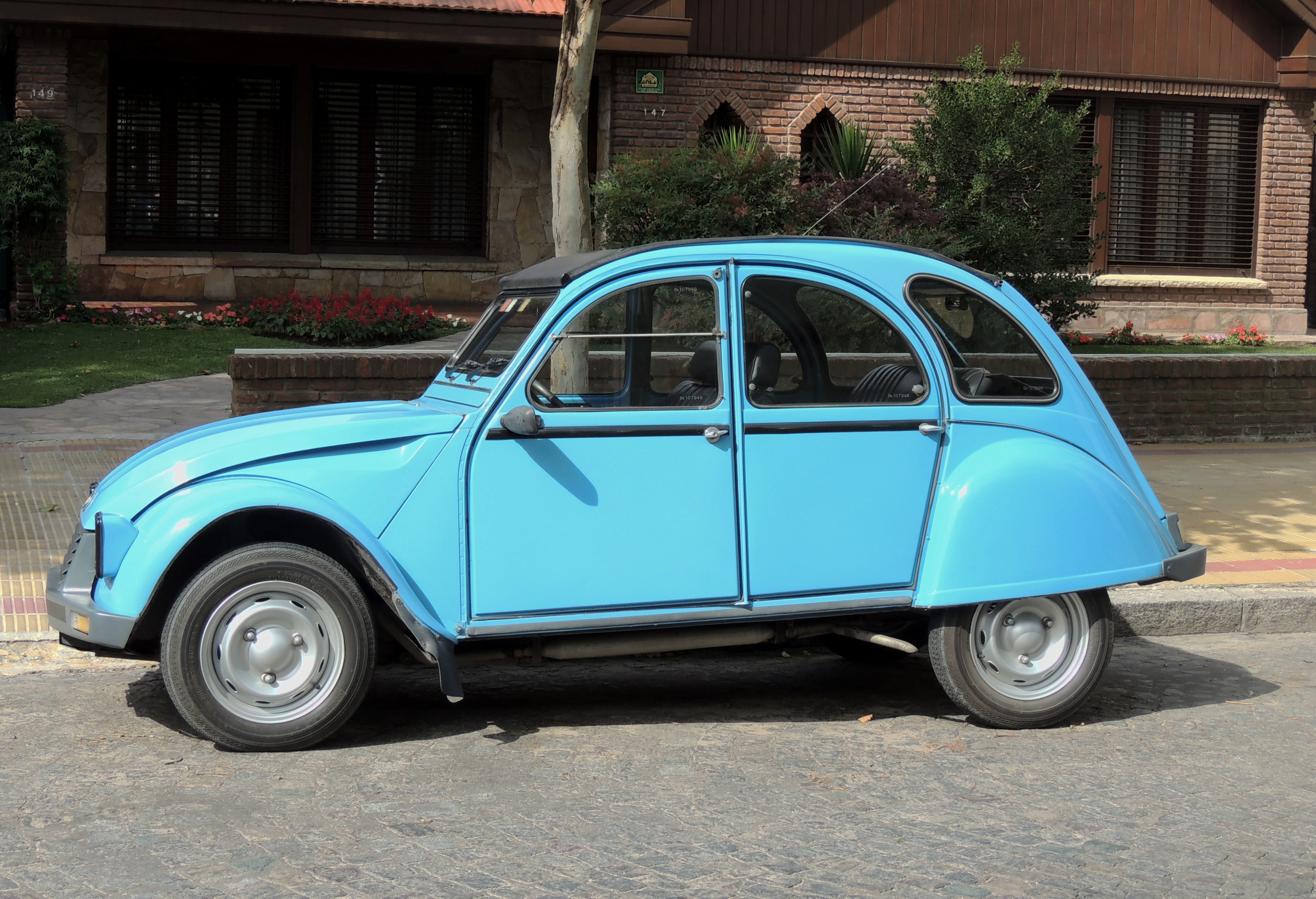
IES 3CV Super América in Argentina

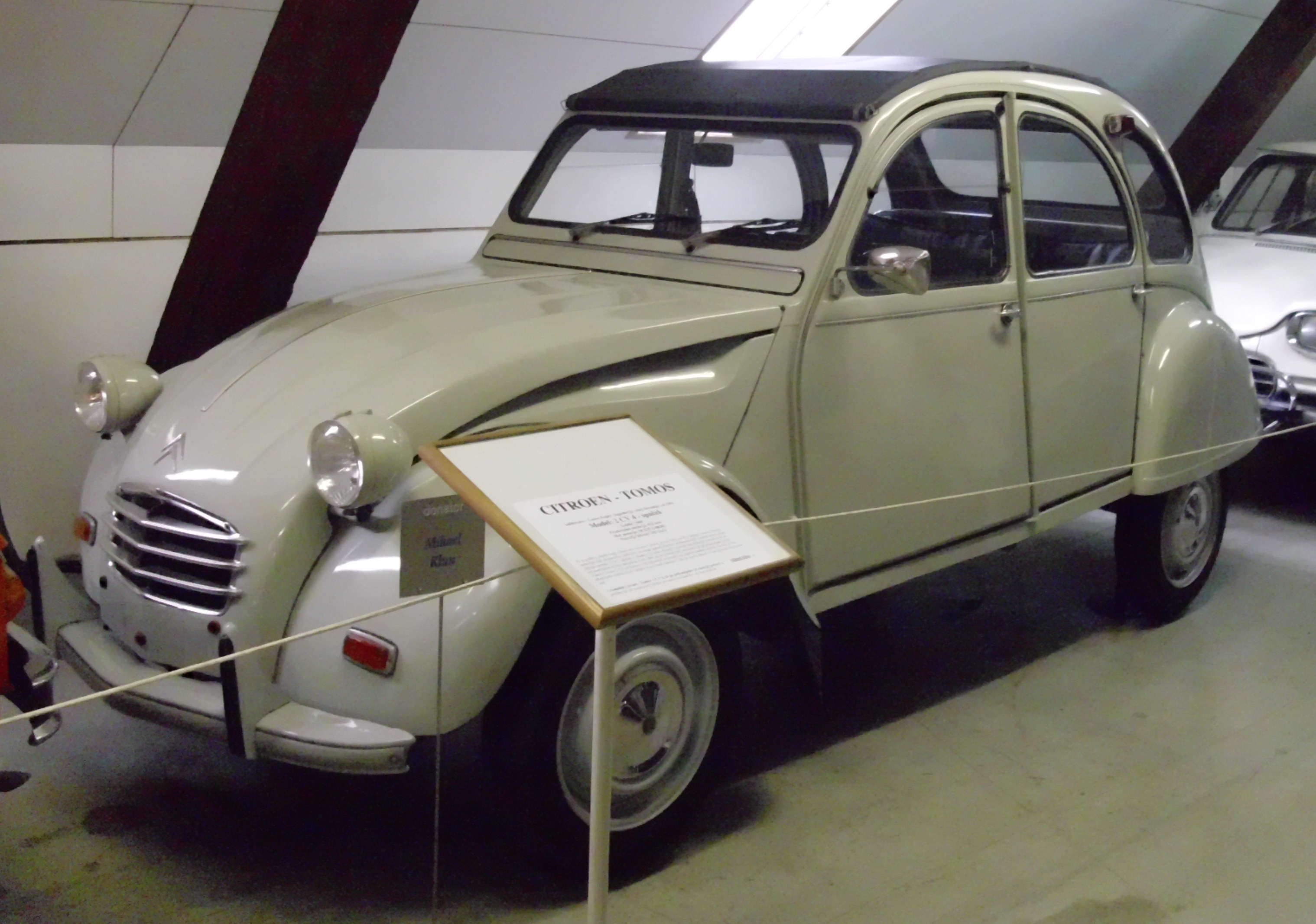
Tomos Yugoslavian built Citroën 2CV

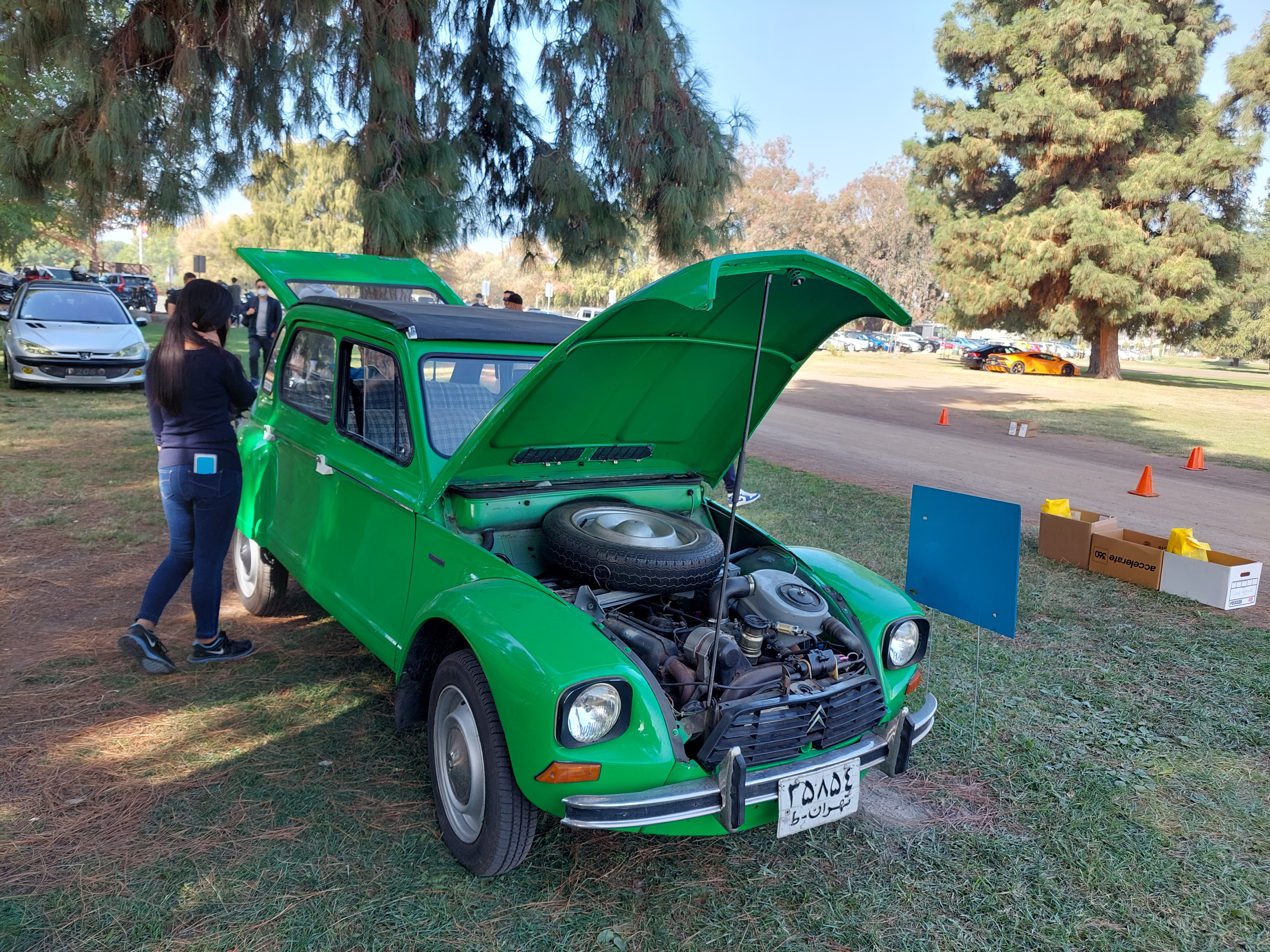
SAIPA Iranian Citroën Dyane called 'Jyane 602'

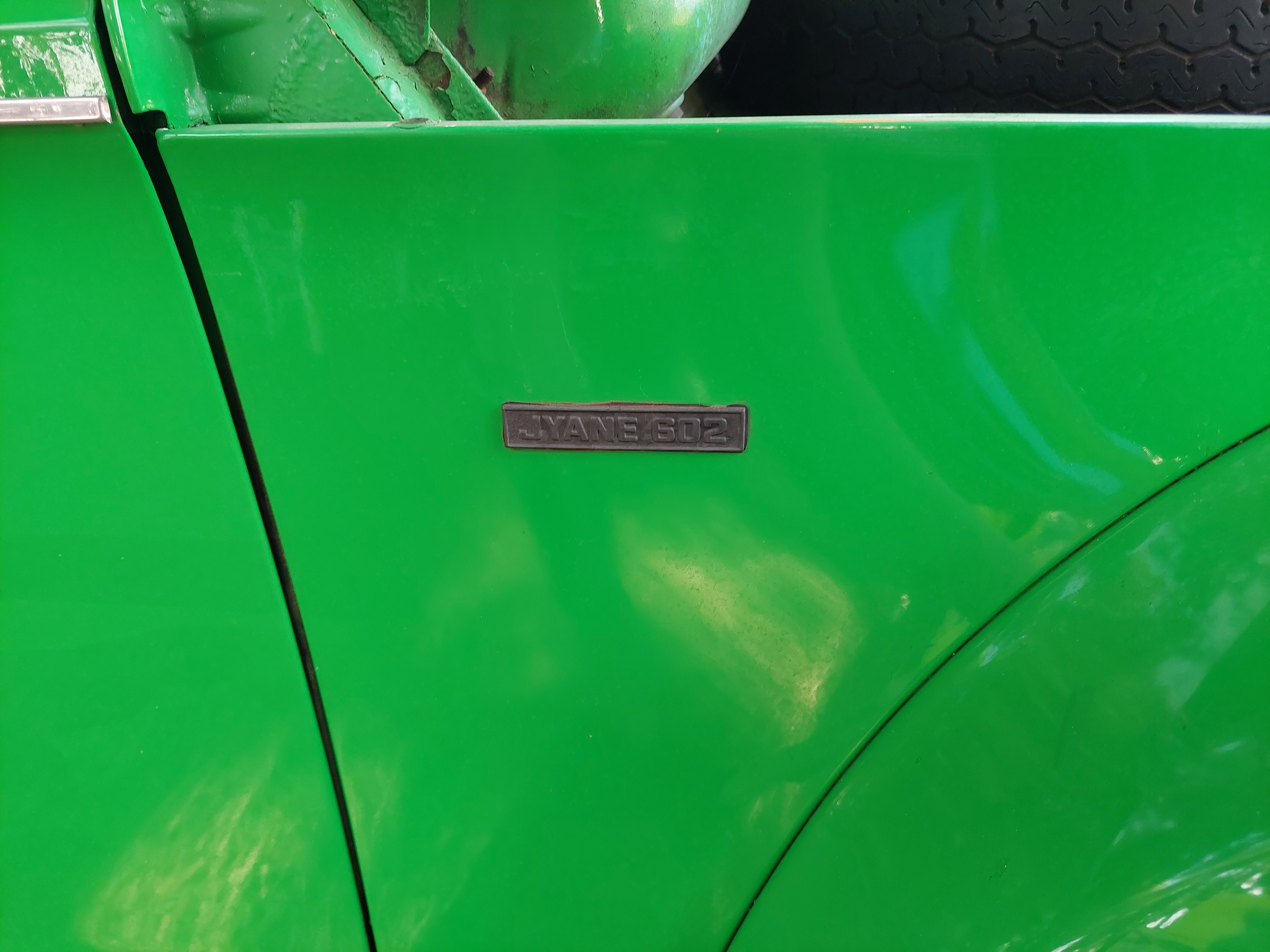
SAIPA Iranian Citroën Dyane 'Jyane 602' nameplate

The 2CV was originally sold in France and some European markets, and went on to enjoy strong sales in Asia, South America, and Africa. During the post-war years Citroën was very focused on the home market, which had some unusual quirks, like puissance fiscale. The management of Michelin was supportive of Citroën up to a point, and with a suspension designed to use Michelin's new radial tyres the Citroën cars clearly demonstrated their superiority over their competitors' tyres. But they were not prepared to initiate the investment needed for the 2CV (or the Citroën DS for that matter) to truly compete on the global stage. Citroën was always under-capitalised until the 1970s Peugeot takeover. The 2CV sold 9 million vehicles; the Volkswagen Beetle, which was available worldwide, sold 21 million units.

Production of the 2CV in Belgium was from 1952 to 1980.

=== Britain ===
Production at Citroën's plant in Slough, England was from 1953 to 1960. Until then British construction and use regulations made cars with inboard front brakes such as the 2CV illegal. Producing the car in Britain allowed Citroën to circumvent trade barriers and to sell cars in the British Empire and Commonwealth. It achieved some success in these markets, to the extent that all Slough-built 2CVs were fitted with improved air cleaners and other modifications to suit the rough conditions found in Australia and Africa, where the 2CV's durability and good ride quality over rough roads attracted buyers. The 2CV sold poorly in Great Britain in part due to its excessive cost, because of import duties on components.

In 1959, the British Royal Navy ordered 65 2CV pick-ups from the Slough plant, following sea tests aboard HMS Bulwark in the West Indies and the Indian Ocean during 1957–58, with the Westland Whirlwind helicopters of 845 squadron RNAS. The pick-ups also served aboard HMS Albion. They were to serve as motor transport with the 42nd Commando regiment of the Royal Marines, which required robust and reliable vehicles to cope with jungle tracks, that were light enough to be taken ashore by helicopter from the aircraft carriers.

In 1959 Slough introduced a unique model, the glass-fibre coupé version called the Bijou. Styling of this car was by Peter Kirwan-Taylor (better known for his work with Colin Chapman of Lotus cars on the 1950s Lotus Elite), but the bodywork proved too heavy for the 425 cc (25.9 cu in) engine to endow it with adequate performance.

In 1975, the 2CV was re-introduced to the British market in the wake of the oil crisis, which resulted in an increasing demand for smaller cars, to which most manufacturers had responded by launching small "supermini" cars, including the Renault 5, Ford Fiesta and Volkswagen Polo.

The second wave of 2CVs for the British market were produced in France but avoided the crippling import duties of the 1950s, because the UK was by then a member of the EEC. In the 1980s, the best foreign markets for the 2CV were the UK and West Germany.

=== South America ===
The 2CV was built in Chile, Uruguay, and Argentina for South America.

==== Chile ====
The 1953 Citroneta model of the 2CV made in Chile and Argentina used a type AZ chassis with 425 cc engine developing 8.8 kW (12 hp). Both chassis and engine were made in France while the "three box" bodywork (in both two- and four-door versions) was designed and produced in Chile. It was the first economy car on the market in Chile. The 1970s Chilean version mounted a 602 cc engine with an output of 24 kW (33 hp), and was designated as the AX-330. It was built between 1970 and 1978, during which it saw changes like different bumpers, a hard roof, front disc brakes, and square headlights.

One of the Citroën FAF models, named the Yagán after an Indigenous peoples tribe, was made in Chile between 1972 and 1973. During the Chilean coup of 1973, 200 Yagáns used by the Army to patrol the streets and the Peruvian border, with 106 mm (4.2 in) cannons.

==== Uruguay ====
From 1965, Nordex produced its own panel van and pick-up versions of the Citroën 2CV. While the doors and the rear structure (in the case of the panel van, the roof as well) were made of sheet steel, the fenders and bonnet were made by Dasur (Danrée, Soler & Bonet) and were made of fiberglass-reinforced plastic. In contrast to the original, the frame was manufactured on a sheet metal bending machine. Start of production was 1966 for the "3CV" model and the Ami 8 model in the 1970s.

The Citroën Méhari and Ranger were produced in a Uruguayan assembly plant between 1970 and 1982. In a joint effort, Dasur made the body out of fiberglass and Nordex made the chassis, while Quintanar sold the vehicles. Around 14,000 vehicles were built, 9,000 of which were exported to Argentina and the rest remained inland.

For the Méhari, a two-cylinder boxer engine with a 74 mm bore, 70 mm stroke, 602 cc displacement and 26 kW (35 hp) power drove the front wheels. The curb weight was 590 kg.

The Méhari Ranger represented a national specialty. With a fixed structure, the Méhari became a station wagon with large glass surfaces. The side windows in front of the doors were also striking. The rear wheel cutouts also differed from the original. This vehicle weighed 700 kg.

From 1978 onwards, Nordex manufactured the Citroën AK 400 from Argentine and Belgian parts for the Argentine market.

Another model produced was the Citroën BX, which had been exported to Brazil since 1992. The production of the Citroën ZX is documented for Nordex in 1995. In Uruguay, Citroën cars were manufactured until 2002.

==== Argentina ====
Citroën Argentina Sociedad Anónima produced 223,442 cars (all A-Series), in Argentina, from 1959 until 1979.

Model designations produced were the 2CV sedan, 3CV hatchback, AZU van, AK van, AK 400 van, AMI 8, and Méhari. The derivation called "3CV" was a special Argentina model with various modifications such as a hatchback.

Citroën Argentina S.A. exported parts to France, Spain, and Chile. Complete automobiles were exported to Paraguay, Bolivia and Cuba. Chassis with mechanics to Uruguay (some returned to the plant as completed Mehari or AK-400 models).

Citroën Argentina outsourced parts to 450 auto parts companies, the national content of the vehicles was over 95% by 1969.

A 2CV with a heavily modified front end called the 3CV IES America was produced well into the 1980s, by an Argentine company that bought the rights and factory from Citroën.

=== North America ===
Only a few 2CVs were sold in North America when they were new; similar to the situation in Britain, their pricing was excessive relative to competitors. The original model that produced 6.6 kW (9 hp) and had a top speed of 64 km/h (40 mph) was unsuited to the expanding post-war US freeway network, and was never widely accepted in North America. Even the fastest of the later models struggled to 115 km/h (71 mph).

=== Yugoslavia ===
Also in 1959, the Yugoslav firm Tomos began producing the 2CV under licence at the Koper plant, in what is today Slovenia. This venture lasted from 1959 to 1985, and grew to encompass many Citroën models. The Yugoslav automobile market was closed, so this joint venture with a local firm allowed Citroën to access the market. In Yugoslavia, 2CV was famous under the nickname Spaček, and still remains better known under that name in its successor states.

=== Africa ===
In the Ivory Coast in 1963, a locally assembled 2CV was sold in some west African countries as the Citroën "Baby-Brousse". This idea of building a "simplified" 2CV in developing countries was subsequently tried several times, as detailed under Citroën Facile à Fabriquer (easy to manufacture). One of these, the 1969 ''La Dalat'', was the first automobile manufactured in Vietnam.

In Madagascar, a former colony of France, the 2CV is so ubiquitous given its use as a taxi that is popularly considered to be a symbol of the country itself.

A home-made 2CV features in the Nigerien film Cocorico! Monsieur Poulet (1977).

=== Iran ===
In 1966, Citroën entered Iran with the 2CV. The 2CV was soon supplanted by the Jiane, a local version of the Citroën Dyane. The cars were originally manufactured in Iran in a joint venture between Citroën and Iran National up until the 1979 Revolution, when Iran National was nationalised, which continued producing the Jiane without the involvement of Citroën. SAIPA built 120,000 Jyane models.

== Production numbers ==
The Citroën factory offered several high volume variant models on the 2CV running gear – the Ami; the Dyane; the Acadiane; and the Méhari. Additionally, the 2CV was built in a wide variety of joint ventures, often with modified designs.

The 2CV and all its variants are collectively known as the A-Series.

Citroën A-Series Production
Model	Years	Units
2CV Saloon	1948–1990	3,867,932
2CV Fourgonette/Truckette/Van	1951–1981	1,246,299
2CV Sahara 4×4	1958–1971	694
Ami 6, Ami 8, Ami Super	1961–1978	1,840,396
Citroën Bijou	1959–1964	212
Citroën Dyane	1967–1983	1,443,583
Citroën Acadiane	1977–1987	253,393
Citroën Méhari 4×2 & 4×4	1968–1988	144,953
Citroën Argentina Sociedad Anónima 2CV, 3CV, AZU Fourgon, AK Fourgon, Ami 8, Méhari	1960–1979	223,442
Industrios Eduardo Sal-Lari S.A. (IES) Argentina 3CV	1983–1986	more than 10,000
IES Argentina 3 CV América	1986–1990	836
IES Argentina 3 CV Súper América	1987–1990	3,096
IES Argentina Méhari Safari	1983–1988	1,000
IES Argentina Méhari Gringa	1988–1990	300
Nordex Méhari Ranger Uruguay	1970–1982	14,000
Citroneta Chile Arica	1953–1979	40,030
Yagán Chile	1973–1976	1,500
Tomos Yugoslavia 2CV, Diana	1959–1972	more than 1
Cimos Yugoslavia 2CV6, Diana, Ami8	1972–1985	more than 1
Cimos Yugoslavia Dak	1981–1985	2,200
Cimos Yugoslavia Geri	1981–1985	900
Fiberfab Sherpa Germany	1975–1980	250
Baby Brousse Ivory Coast	1963–1979	1,320
Société Anonyme Iranienne de Production des Automobiles Citroën (SAIPAC) Iran 2CV, Jian, Jian pick-up	1965–1980	120,000
SAIPAC Iran Méhari with metal body	1970–1979	9,315
Namco Pony Greece	1974–1983	16,680
Méhari Guinea Bissau & Senegal & CAR	1979–1983	360
Citroën Dalat Việt Nam	1969–1975	3,850
Indonesia Baby Brousse	1982–1987	480
Citroën FAF	1977–1981	1,786
Total		9,248,809

== Construction ==
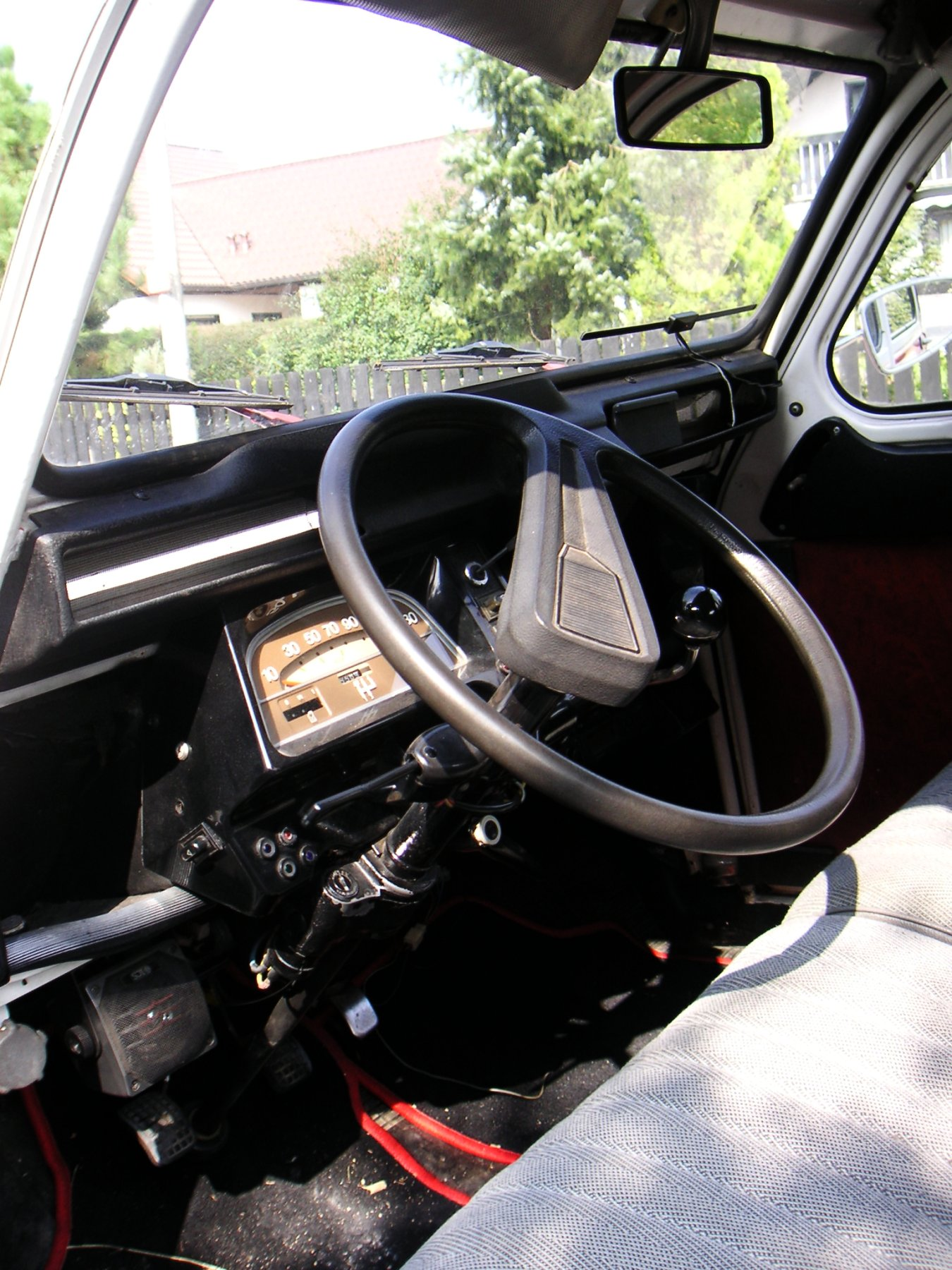
1970s interior

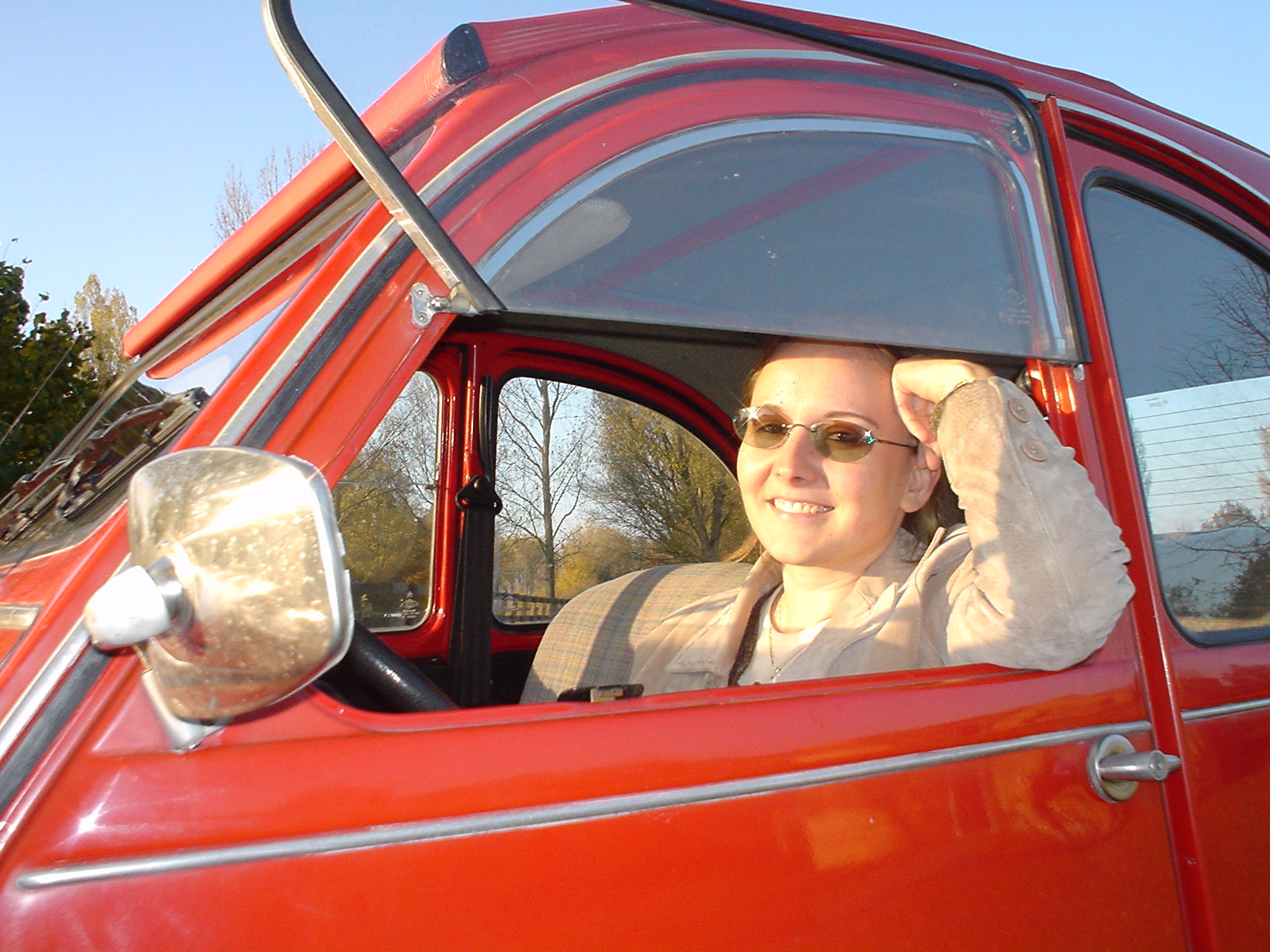
All 2CVs have flap-up windows: roll-up windows were considered too heavy and expensive in 1948 and the design (thin doors) did not allow any updates.

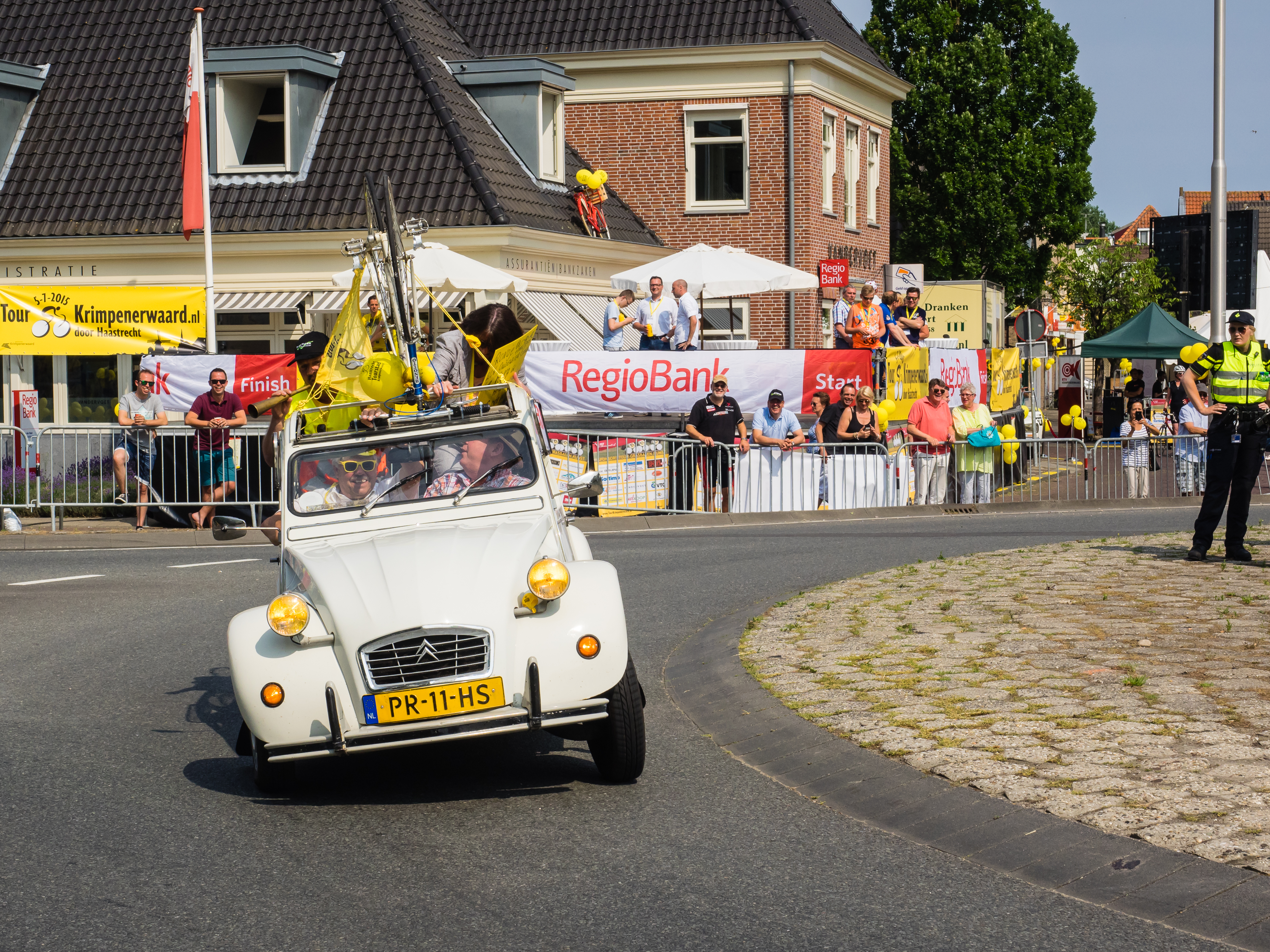
2CV driving through a corner (with person standing in car)

The level of technology in the 1948 2CV was remarkable for the era. While colours and detail specifications were modified in the ensuing 42 years, the biggest mechanical change was the addition of front disc brakes (by then already fitted for several years in the mechanically similar Citroën Dyane 6) in October 1981 (for the 1982 model year). The reliability of the car was enhanced by the minimalist simplification of the designers, being air-cooled (with an oil cooler), it had no coolant, radiator, water pump or thermostat. It had no distributor either, just a contact breaker system. Except for the brakes, there were no hydraulic parts on original models; damping was by tuned mass dampers and friction dampers.

The 1948 car featured radial tyres, which had just been commercialised; front-wheel drive; rack and pinion steering mounted inside the front suspension cross-tube, away from a frontal impact; rear fender skirts (the suspension design allowed wheel changes without removing the skirts); bolt-on detachable front and rear wings; detachable doors, bonnet (and boot lid after 1960), by "slide out" P-profile sheet metal hinges; flap-up windows, as roll-up windows were considered too heavy and expensive.; and detachable full length fabric sunroof and boot lid, for almost pickup-like load-carrying versatility. Ventilation in addition to the sunroof and front flap windows was provided by an opening flap under the windscreen. The car had load adjustable headlights and a heater (heaters were standardised on British economy cars in the 1960s).

=== Body ===
The body was constructed of a dual H-frame platform chassis and aircraft-style tube framework, and a very thin steel shell that was bolted to the chassis. Because the original design brief called for a low speed car, little or no attention was paid to aerodynamics; the body had a drag coefficient of Cd=0.51, high by today's standards but typical for the era.

The 2CV used the fixed-profile convertible, where the doors and upper side elements of its bodywork remain fixed although, the doors could be removed easily too by lifting them up and away from the car. The bonnet too could be removed by sliding sideways to allow extra ventilation on very hot days. The fabric soft top can be rolled back and a picnic basket was available for purchase and fixed on the boot door. This reduces weight and lowers the centre of gravity, and allows the carrying of long or irregularly shaped items, but the key reason was that fabric was cheaper than steel which was in short supply and expensive after the war. The fixed-profile concept was quite popular in this period.

=== Suspension ===
The suspension of the 2CV was very soft; a person could easily rock the car side to side dramatically. The swinging arm, fore-aft linked suspension system with inboard front brakes had a much smaller unsprung mass than existing coil spring or leaf spring designs. The design was modified by Marcel Chinon.

The system comprises two suspension cylinders mounted horizontally on each side of the platform chassis. Inside the cylinders are two springs, one for each wheel, mounted at each end of the cylinder. The springs are connected to the front leading swinging arm and rear trailing swinging arm, that act like bellcranks by pull rods (tie rods). These are connected to spring seating cups in the middle of the cylinder, each spring being compressed independently, against the ends of the cylinder. Each cylinder is mounted using an additional set of springs, originally made from steel, called "volute" springs, on later models made from rubber. These allow the front and rear suspension to interconnect. When the front wheel is deflected up over a bump, the front pull rod compresses the front spring inside the cylinder, against the front of the cylinder. This also compresses the front volute spring pulling the whole cylinder forwards. That action pulls the rear wheel down on the same side via the rear spring assembly and pull rod. When the rear wheel meets that bump a moment later, it does the same in reverse, keeping the car level front to rear. When both springs are compressed on one side when travelling around a bend, or front and rear wheels hit bumps simultaneously, the equal and opposite forces applied to the front and rear spring assemblies reduce the interconnection. It reduces pitching, which is a particular problem of soft car suspension.

The swinging arms are mounted with large bearings to "cross tubes" that run side to side across the chassis; combined with the effects of all-independent soft springing and excellent damping, keeps the road wheels in contact with the road surface and parallel to each other across the axles at high angles of body roll. A larger than conventional steering castor angle, ensures that the front wheels are closer to vertical than the rears, when cornering hard with a lot of body roll. The soft springing, long suspension travel and the use of leading and trailing arms means that as the body rolls during cornering the wheelbase on the outside of the corner increases while the wheelbase on the inside of the corner decreases. As the cornering forces put more of the car's weight on the outside pair of wheels the wheelbase extends in proportion, keeping the car's weight balance and centre of grip constant, promoting excellent road holding. The other key factor in the quality of its road holding is the very low and forward centre of gravity, provided by the position of the engine and transmission.

The suspension also automatically accommodates differing payloads in the car – with four people and cargo on board the wheelbase increases by around 4 cm (2 in) as the suspension deflects, and the castor angle of the front wheels increases by as much as 8 degrees thus ensuring that ride quality, handling and road holding are almost unaffected by the additional weight. On early cars friction dampers (like a dry version of a multi-plate clutch design) were fitted at the mountings of the front and rear swinging arms to the cross-tubes. Because the rear brakes were outboard, they had extra tuned mass dampers to damp wheel bounce from the extra unsprung mass. Later models had tuned mass dampers ("batteurs") at the front (because the leading arm had more inertia and "bump/thump" than the trailing arm), with hydraulic telescopic dampers / shock absorbers front and rear. The uprated hydraulic damping obviated the need for the rear inertia dampers. It was designed to be a comfortable ride by matching the frequencies encountered in human bipedal motion.

This suspension design ensured the road wheels followed ground contours underneath them closely, while insulating the vehicle from shocks, enabling the 2CV to be driven over a ploughed field without breaking any eggs, as its design brief required. More importantly it could comfortably and safely drive at reasonable speed, along the ill-maintained and war-damaged post-war French Routes Nationales. It was commonly driven "Pied au Plancher"—"foot to the floor" by their peasant owners.

=== Front-wheel drive and gearbox ===
Citroën had developed expertise with front-wheel drive due to the pioneering Traction Avant, which was the first mass-produced steel monocoque front-wheel-drive car in the world. The 2CV was originally equipped with a sliding splined joint, and twin Hookes type universal joints on its driveshafts; later models used constant velocity joints and a sliding splined joint.

The gearbox was a four-speed manual transmission, an advanced feature on an inexpensive car at the time. The gear stick came horizontally out of the dashboard with the handle curved upwards. It had a strange shift pattern: the first was back on the left, the second and third were inline, and the fourth (or the S) could be engaged only by turning the lever to the right from the third. Reverse was opposite first. The idea was to put the most used gears opposite each other—for parking, first and reverse; for normal driving, second and third. This layout was adopted from the H-van's three-speed gearbox. Later models had an option for a semi-automatic clutch that allow the user to engage the first gear and wait at the traffic lights with the foot on the brakes only.

=== Other ===
The windscreen wipers were powered by a purely mechanical system: a cable connected to the transmission; to reduce cost, this cable also powered the speedometer. The wipers' speed was therefore dependent on car speed. When the car was stationary, the wipers were not powered; thus, a handle under the speedometer allowed them to be operated by hand. The wipers and speedometer could not be used at the same time. From 1962, the wipers were powered by a single-speed electric motor. The car came with only a speedometer and an ammeter.

The 2CV design predates the invention of disc brake, so 1948–1981 cars have drum brakes on all four wheels. In October 1981, front disc brakes were fitted. Disc brake cars use green LHM fluid – a mineral oil – which is not compatible with standard glycol brake fluid. The disc brakes were forced-air cooled by ducts drawing air from the engine fan housing, greatly reducing the likelihood of the brakes to overheat or fade in heavy use – especially during long descents in hot summer conditions in the Alps and other mountain regions.

== Engines ==
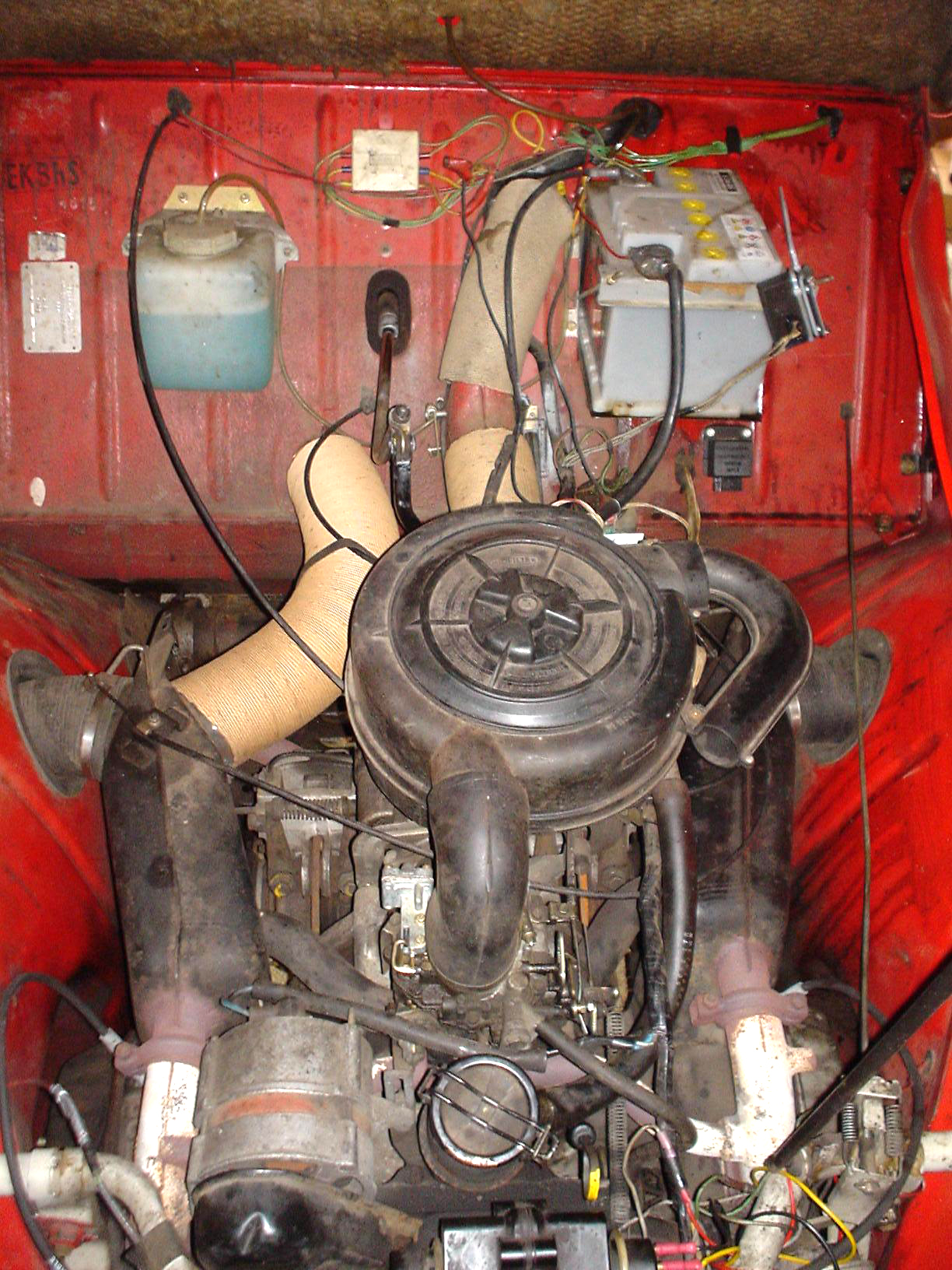
2CV6 engine compartment, post-1981 (with inboard disc brakes)

2CV ignition system diagram

Movement of flat-twin engine pistons, connecting rods and crankshaft (The illustration is erroneous, falsely showing that the stroke of the right piston is shorter than that of the left. The left side is accurate and the movement should be symmetrical.)

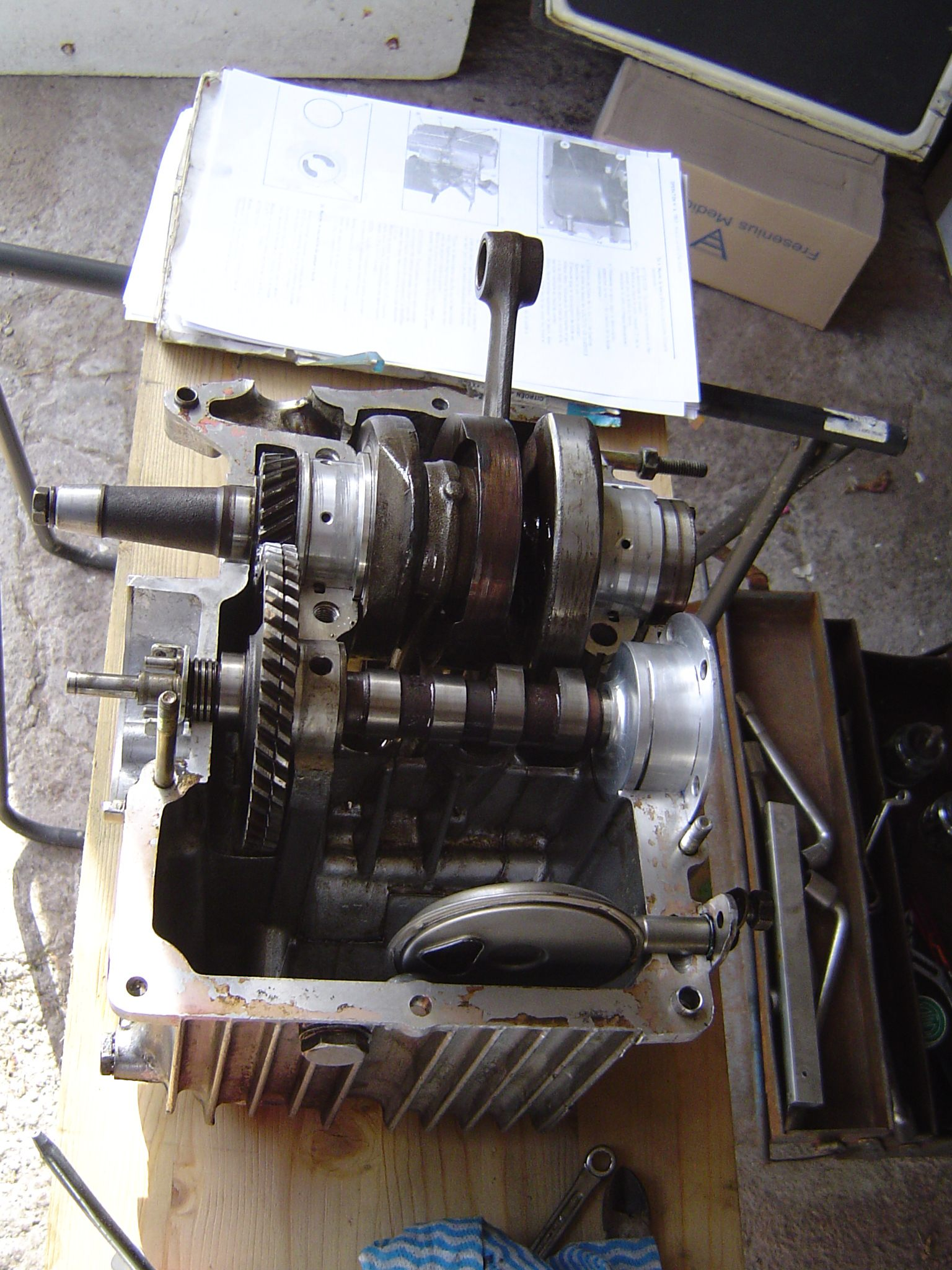
2CV flat-twin engine halved with piston removed—showing connecting rod, crankshaft, crankcase, camshaft, spring-loaded split timing gear and engine oil pickup

The engine was designed by Walter Becchia and Lucien Gerard, with a nod to the classic BMW boxer motorcycle engine. It was an air-cooled, flat-twin, four-stroke, 375 cc engine with pushrod operated overhead valves and a hemispherical combustion chamber. The earliest model developed 9 hp DIN (6.6 kW). A 425 cc engine was introduced in 1955 with initially 12 hp (8.8 kW), later increased to 18 hp (13.2 kW), followed in 1970 by a 602 cc one giving 28 hp (20.6 kW) at 7000 rpm. With the 602 cc engine, the tax classification was bumped into the 3CV category, but the name remained unchanged. A 435 cc engine was introduced at the same time to replace the 425 cc unit; the 435 cc engine car was named 2CV 4 while the 602 cc took the name 2CV 6 (a variant in Argentina took the name 3CV). The 602 cc engine evolved to the M28 with 33 hp (24.3 kW) in 1970; this was the most powerful engine fitted to the 2CV. A new 602 cc giving 29 hp (21.3 kW) at a slower 5,750 rpm was introduced in 1979, being the final version. This engine was less powerful, and more efficient, allowing lower fuel consumption and better top speed, at the price of decreased acceleration. All 2CVs with the M28 engine can run on unleaded petrol.

The 2CV used the wasted spark ignition system for simplicity and reliability and had only speed-controlled ignition timing, no vacuum advance taking account of engine load. The inlet and exhaust manifolds were welded together into a single unit, with exhaust pipe and inlet tract abutting each other directly under the carburettor at an enlarged 'heat chamber'. Heat from the exhaust warmed both the metal and the air/fuel mixture inside the chamber, ensuring full vaporization of the fuel for greater combustion efficiency. The chamber also served as a reservoir of fuel/air mixture downstream of the carburettor body, allowing each cylinder to draw an equal and balanced amount of mixture for further efficiency and smooth-running. The heat chamber principle was especially suitable for an engine running at wide open throttle and heavy loads for long periods of time, as was intended for the 2CV, when the throttle plate in the carburettor would be fully open, the manifold vacuum would be low and the exhaust temperatures would be high.

Unlike other air-cooled cars (such as the Volkswagen Beetle and the Fiat 500) the 2CV's engine had no thermostat valve in its oil system. The engine needed more time for oil to reach normal operating temperature in cold weather. All the oil passed through an oil cooler behind the fan and received the full cooling effect regardless of oil temperature. This removes the risk of overheating from a jammed thermostat that can afflict water- and air-cooled engines and the engine can withstand many hours of running under heavy load at high engine speeds even in hot weather. To prevent the engine running cool in cold weather (and to improve the output of the cabin heater) all 2CVs were supplied with a grille blind (canvas on early cars and a clip-on plastic item, called a "muff" in the owner's handbook, on later ones) which blocked around half the aperture to reduce the flow of air to the engine. Like many other air-cooled car engines, the 2CV's oil sump was wide and shallow, being formed from extensions to the crankcase castings in the form of an inverted 'T'. The exterior of the sump was formed with cooling fins and the underside protruded below the level of the chassis rails, exposing the sump to the flow of air as the car drove along. The shape of the sump ensured that as much of the oil within as possible lay close to the cooled metal on the underside, further helping to regulate the oil temperature. As with the oil cooler, this cooling effect was unregulated and varied greatly depending on air temperature, vehicle speed and engine load.

The engine's design concentrated on the reduction of moving parts. The cooling fan and dynamo were built integrally with the one-piece crankshaft, removing the need for drive belts. The use of gaskets, seen as another potential weak point for failure and leaks, was also kept to a minimum. The cylinder heads are mated to the cylinder barrels by lapped joints with extremely fine tolerances, as are the two halves of the crankcase and other surface-to-surface joints.

As well as the close tolerances between parts, the engine's lack of gaskets was made possible by a unique crankcase ventilation system. On any two-cylinder boxer engine, such as the 2CV's, the volume of the crankcase is reduced by the engine displacement volume when the pistons move together. This, combined with the inevitable small amount of "leakage" of combustion gases past the pistons, leads to a positive pressure in the crankcase which must be removed in the interests of engine efficiency and to prevent oil and gas leaks. The 2CV's engine has a combined engine "breather" and oil filler assembly which contains a series of rubber reed valves. These allow positive pressure to escape the crankcase (to the engine air intake to be recirculated) but close when the pressure in the crankcase drops as the pistons move apart. Because gases are expelled but not admitted this creates a slight vacuum in the crankcase so that any weak joint or failed seal causes air to be sucked in rather than allowing oil to leak out.

As well as features intended for durability and efficiency, the early 2CV engines were also significantly under-tuned, making much less power than was theoretically possible. The original 375 cc engine featured deliberately small-diameter inlet tracts and a small-diameter carburettor with conservative fuel jet sizes. This restricted both the engine's power output and its maximum rotational speed to far below the actual limits of its component parts, ensuring that however hard it was driven and despite extremes of temperature, it would not be close to its ultimate limits. The 375 cc engine produced its 6.6 kW (9 hp) at 3500rpm and peak torque at 2000rpm. Many of the improvements in power output made to the 2CV engine over its production life were merely the result of removing the original in-built restrictions with more efficient carburettors, manifolds and valve events. The power peak speed was raised to 4200rpm for the 9.2 kW (12.5 hp) 425cc engine from 1955, 4500rpm from 1962 and 5000 rpm – with 13 kW (18 hp) – from 1963. The new 602 cc and 435 cc engines introduced in 1970 made their power at 6750rpm – nearly double the speed of the original engine from 1948 but with very few changes to the engine's internal design or components. If the original 375 cc engine had the same power density as the original 24 kW (33 hp) 602 cc version it would have produced 14 kW (19 hp), more than double its actual rated output. The original principle of deliberately restricting the engine's speed returned in 1979 for the revised M28 602 cc engine, which had its carburettor and camshaft altered to make reduced power at a lower speed of 5750rpm in the interests of lower overall fuel consumption and better torque delivery. Even the most highly-tuned factory versions of the 2CV engine do not come close to the unit's actual upper limits – 2CVs used in the car's racing series use standard engines tuned to around 33 kW (45 hp) which still prove reliable even in long 24-hour endurance competitions.

These design features made the 2CV engine highly reliable; test engines were run at full speed for 1000 hours at a time, equivalent to driving 80,000 km (50,000 mi) at full throttle. They also meant that the engine was "sealed for life"—for example, replacing the big-end bearings required specialised equipment to dismantle and reassemble the built-up crankshaft, and as this was often not available the entire crankshaft had to be replaced. The engine is very under-stressed and long-lived, so this is not a major issue.

If the starter motor or battery failed, the 2CV had the option of hand-cranking, the jack handle serving as starting handle through dogs on the front of the crankshaft at the centre of the fan. This feature, once universal on cars and still common in 1948 when the 2CV was introduced, was kept until the end of production in 1990.

== Performance ==
In relation to the 2CV's performance and acceleration, it was joked that it went "from 0–60 km/h in one day". The original 1948 model that produced 6.6 kW (9 hp) had a 0–40 km/h (0–25 mph) time of 42.4 seconds and a top speed of 64 km/h (40 mph), far below the speeds necessary for North American highways or the German Autobahns of the day. The top speed increased with engine size to 80 km/h (50 mph) in 1955, 84 km/h (52 mph) in 1962, 100 km/h (62 mph) in 1970, and 115 km/h (71 mph) in 1981.

The last evolution of the 2CV engine was the Citroën Visa flat-twin, a 652 cc featuring electronic ignition. Citroën never sold this engine in the 2CV, but some enthusiasts have converted their 2CVs to 652 engines, or even transplanted Citroën GS or GSA flat-four engines and gearboxes.

In the mid-1980s Car magazine editor Steve Cropley ran and reported on a turbocharged 602 cc 2CV that was developed by engineer Richard Wilsher.

== End of production ==
The 2CV was produced for 42 years, the model finally succumbing to customer demands for speed, in which this ancient design had fallen significantly behind modern cars, and safety. Although the front of the chassis was designed to fold up, to form a crumple zone according to a 1984 Citroën brochure, in common with other small cars of its era its crashworthiness was very poor by modern standards. (The drive for improved safety in Europe happened from the 1990s onwards, and accelerated with the 1997 advent of Euro NCAP.) Its advanced underlying engineering was ignored or misunderstood by the public, being clothed in an anachronistic body. It was the butt of many a joke, famously by Jasper Carrott in the UK ("if a Citroen 2CV hit a rabbit, the car would be a write-off, while the rabbit would probably think something was stuck in its ear", "only the French could make a car like that and then sell it to the British", "an upturned corrugated crab on wheels").

Citroën had attempted to replace the ultra-utilitarian 2CV several times (with the Dyane, Visa, and the AX). Its comically antiquated appearance became an advantage to the car, and it became a niche product which sold because it was different from anything else on sale. Because of its down-to-earth economy car style, it became popular with people who wanted to distance themselves from mainstream consumerism—"hippies"—and also with environmentalists.

Although not a replacement for the 2CV, the AX supermini, a conventional urban runabout, unremarkable apart from its exceptional lightness, seemed to address the car makers' requirements at the entry level in the early 1990s. Officially, the last 2CV, a Charleston, which was reserved for Mangualde's plant manager, rolled off the Portuguese production line on 27 July 1990, although five additional 2CV Spécials were produced afterwards.

The 2CV was outlived by contemporaries such as the Mini (1959–2000), Volkswagen Beetle (1939–2003), Renault 4 (1961–1992), Volkswagen Type 2 (1949–2013), Fiat 126 (1972–2000) and Hindustan Ambassador (1957–2014).

== Continued popularity ==
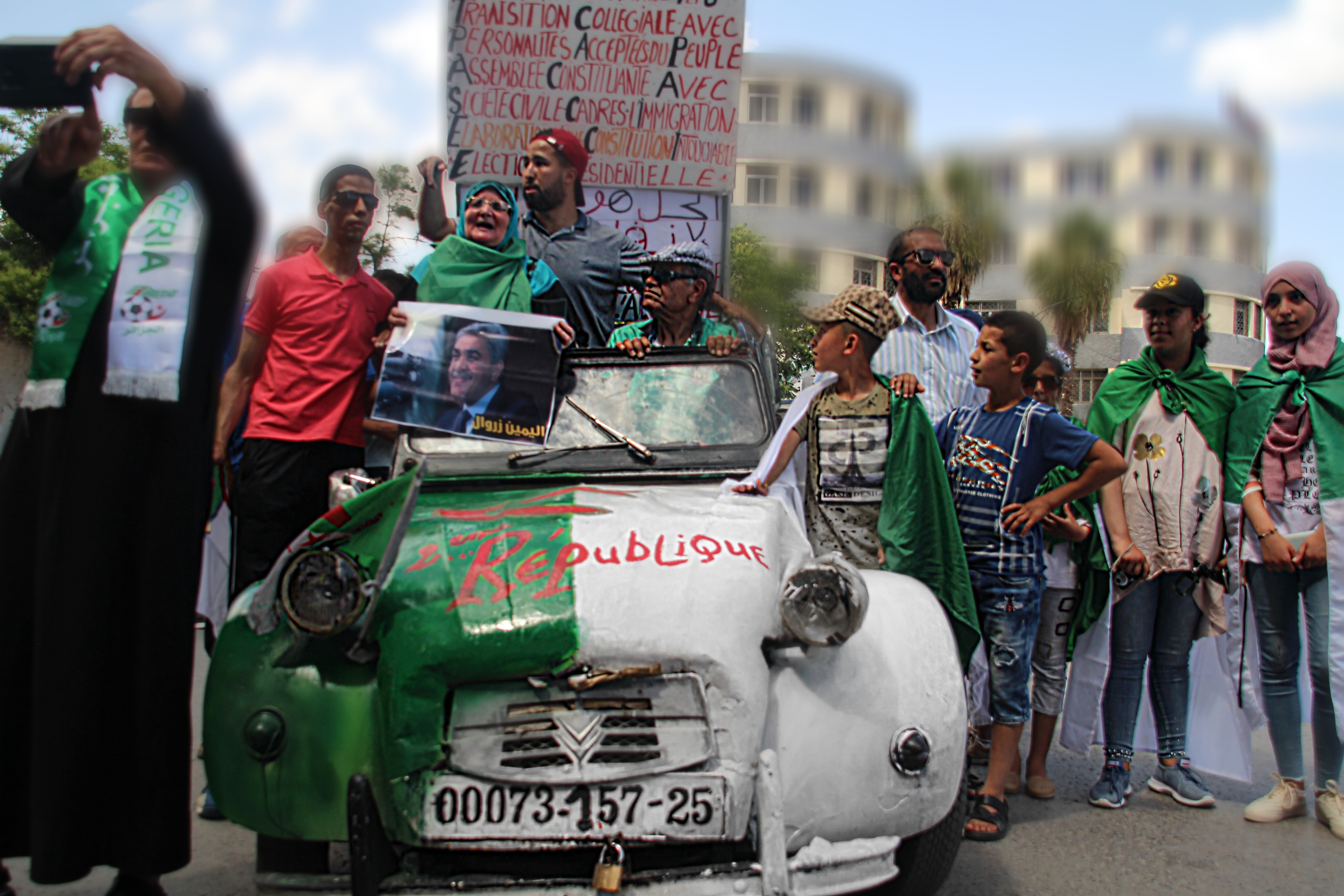
Flag-painted 2 CV during Algerian protests in 2019.

The Chrysler CCV or Composite Concept Vehicle developed in the mid-1990s is a concept car designed to illustrate new manufacturing methods suitable for developing countries. The car is a tall, roomy four-door sedan of small dimensions. The designers at Chrysler said they were inspired to create a modernised 2CV.

The company Sorevie of Lodève was building 2CVs until 2002. The cars were built from scratch using mostly new parts. But as the 2CV no longer complied with safety regulations, the cars were sold as second-hand cars using chassis and engine numbers from old 2CVs.

The long-running 2CV circuit racing series organized by The Classic 2CV Racing Club continues to be popular in the UK.

In France the car is also known as Deudueche, an abbreviation of Deux Chevaux (lit. "two horses").

Some English nicknames include "Flying Dustbin", "Tin Snail", "Dolly", and "Tortoise".

== Other variants ==
Several lower volume variants were produced.

=== "Sahara" four-wheel drive ===
One novel model was the 2CV Sahara, a four-wheel drive (4×4) car, equipped with two engines of 8.8 kW (12 hp) each, each one having a separate fuel tank, two gearboxes, and a connecting rod between the gearboxes. One was mounted in the front driving the front wheels and one in the back driving the rear wheels. A single gearstick, clutch pedal and accelerator were connected to both engines. It was originally intended for use by the French colonies in Northern Africa. As well as a decreased chance of being stranded, it provided four-wheel-drive traction with continuous drive to some wheels while others were slipping because the engine transmissions were uncoupled. Therefore, it became popular with off-road enthusiasts. Between 1958 and 1971, Citroën built 694 Saharas. The top speed was 65 km/h (40 mph) on one engine, and 105 km/h (65 mph) with both engines running. These rare vehicles are highly collectible.

The Méhari was also built as a 4×4 from May 1979, but with only one engine and a reduction gear.

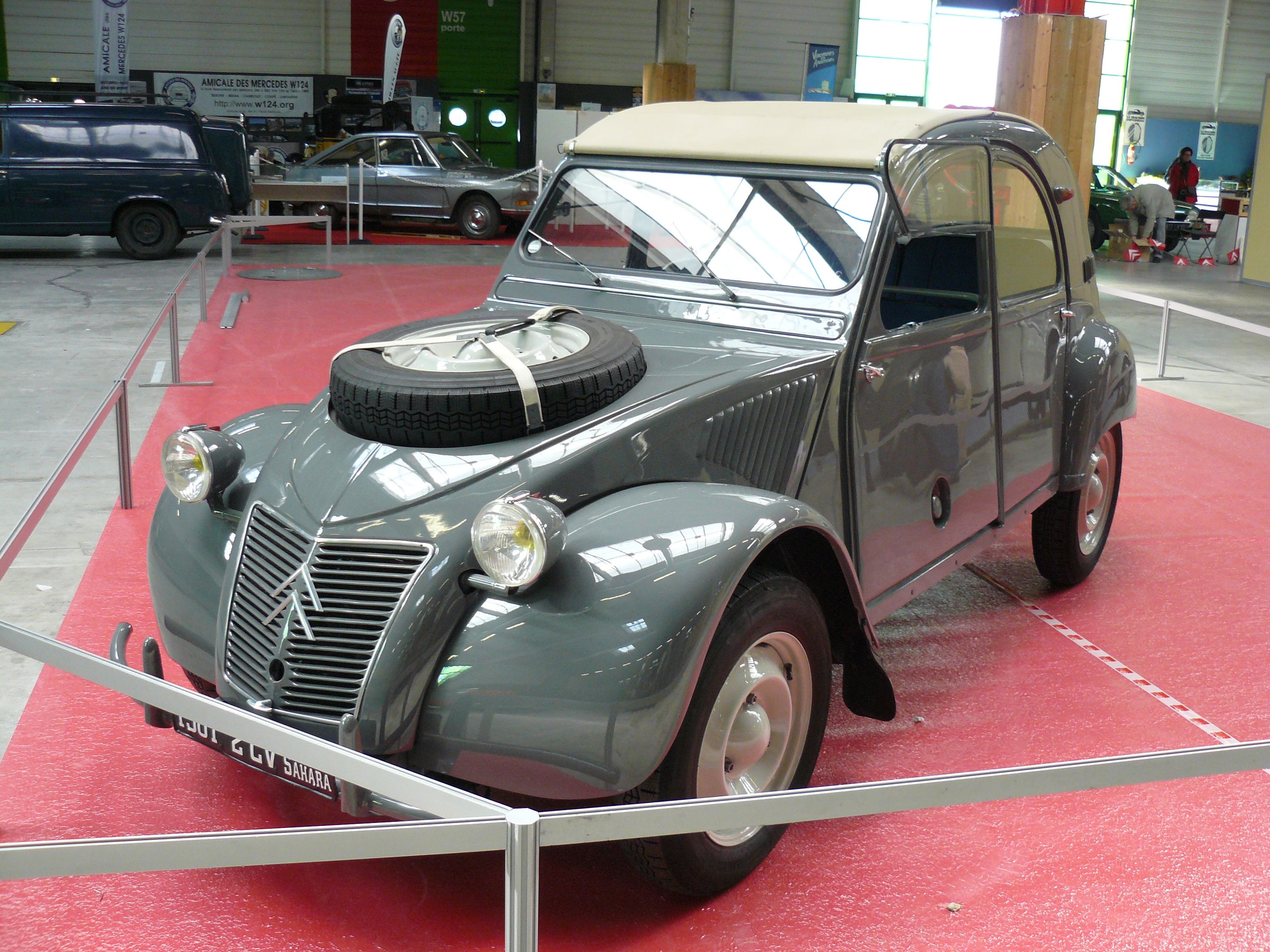
Citroën 2CV Sahara

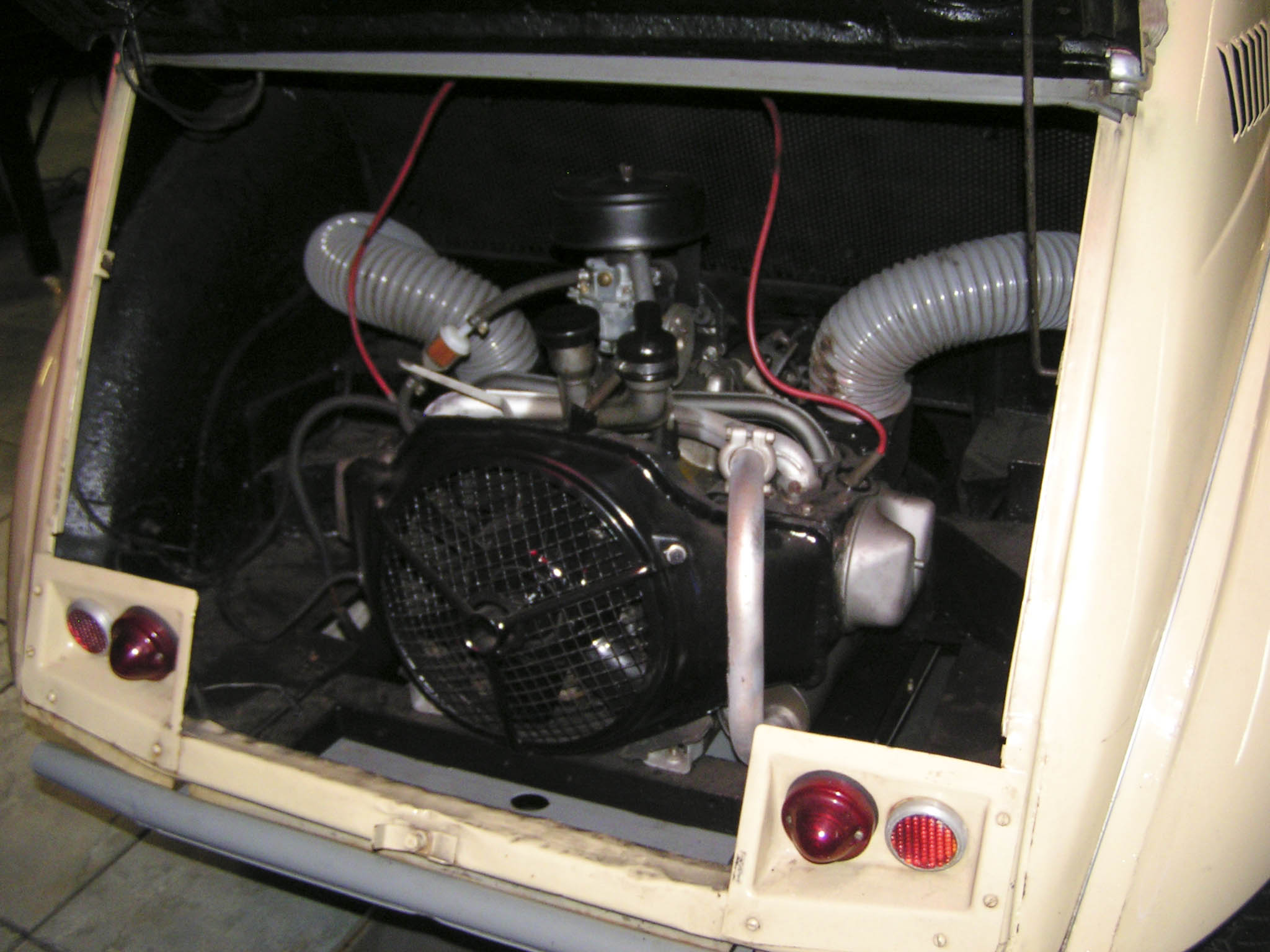
Sahara rear engine bay

=== Bijou ===
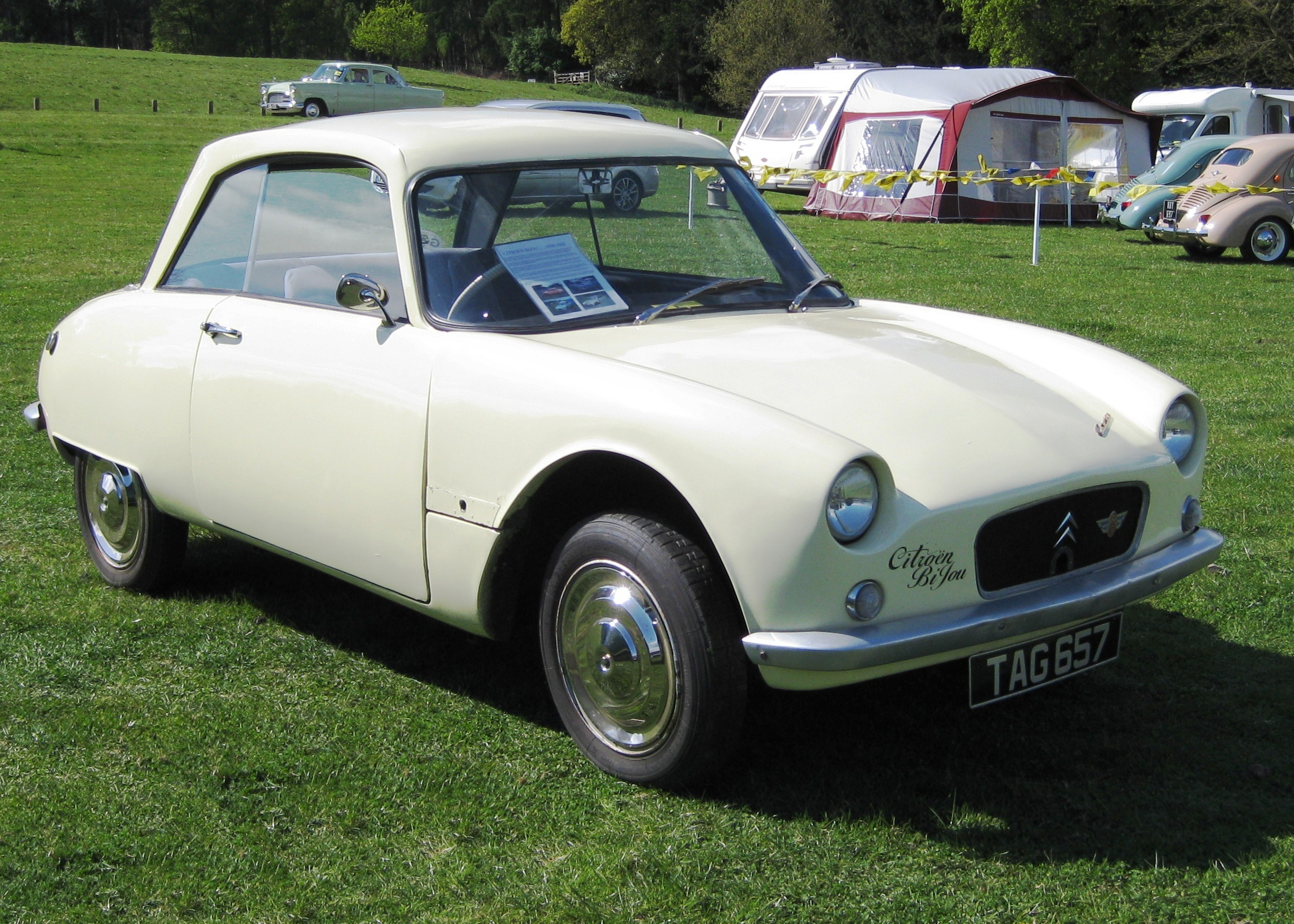
Citroën Bijou

The Bijou was built at the Citroën factory in Slough, UK in the early 1960s. It was a two-door fibreglass-bodied version of the 2CV designed by Peter Kirwan-Taylor, who had been involved in styling the original 1950s Lotus Elite. The design was thought to be more acceptable in appearance to British consumers than the standard 2CV. Incorporating some components from the DS (most noticeably the single-spoke steering wheel, and windscreen for the rear window), it did not achieve market success, because it was heavier than the 2CV and still used the 425 cc engine and so was even slower, reaching 100 km/h (62 mph) only under favourable conditions. It was also more expensive than the Austin Mini, which was more practical. 212 were built.

=== Complete knock down (CKD) locally built cars ===
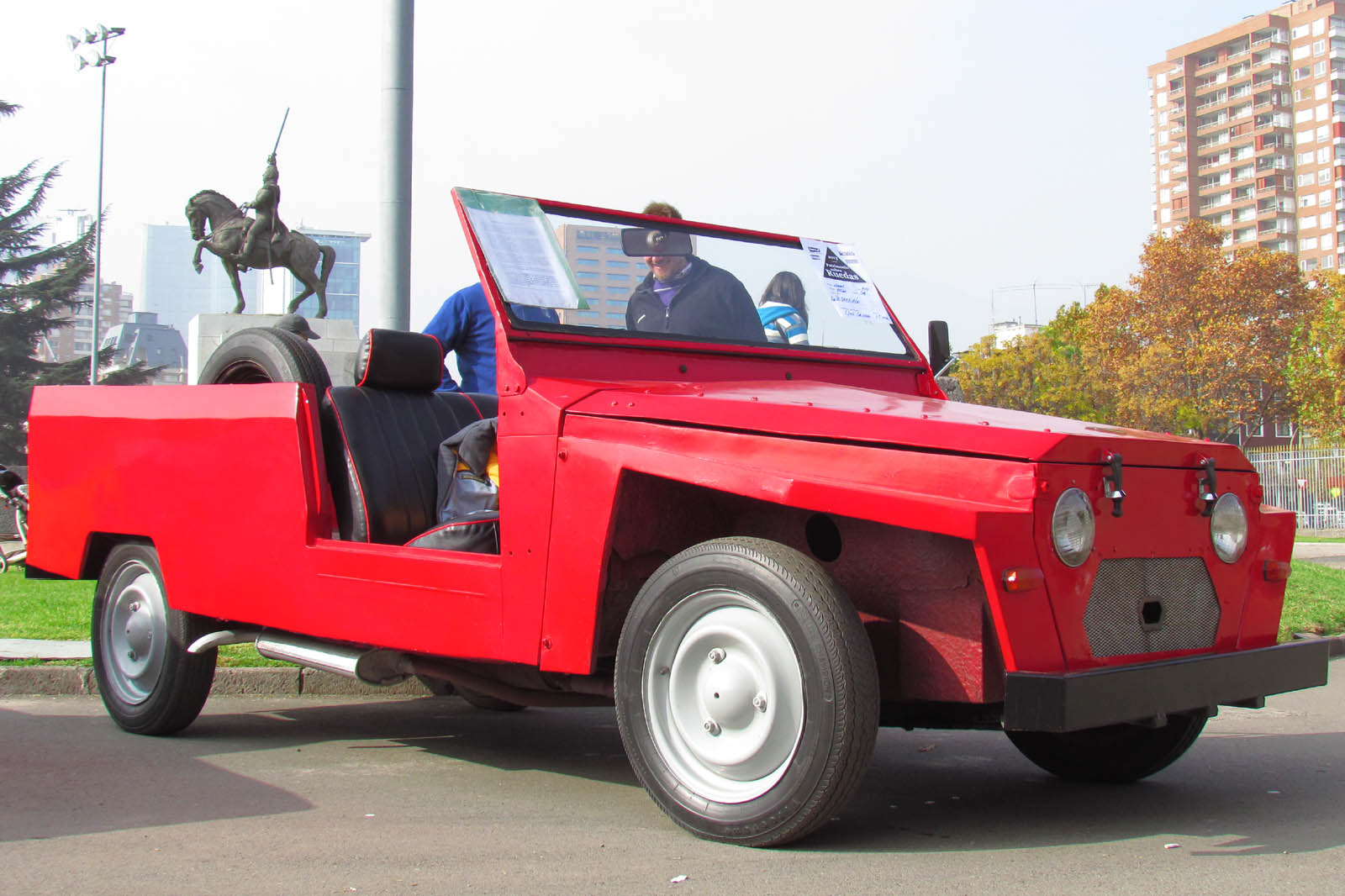
CKD Citroën Yagán (Chile)

The Greek market Citroën Pony and African market Citroën FAF and Baby-Brousse were flat-panelled Mehari type, 2CV based utility cars, built from kits of mechanical parts, with many components sourced locally. They were built in low technology assembly plants. There was widespread production of similar 2CV-based vehicles in a large number of countries, including Iran (Baby-Brousse, Jyane-Mehari), Vietnam (Dalat), Chile (Yagan), Belgium (VanClee), Spain, Portugal and others.

=== Citroën Coccinelle project ===
The Citroën Prototype C was a range of experimental non-production vehicles created by Citroën from 1955 to 1956 under the direction of André Lefèbvre. The idea was to produce a water drop-shaped, very lightweight vehicle, which would be more modern and smaller than the 2CV. One of the prototypes, the Citroën C-10 has survived and is still owned by Citroën. The overall look of the vehicle was quite similar to the Messerschmitt bubble car. It was equipped with the same 425 cc engine as the 2CV. The vehicle was also nicknamed Citroën Coccinelle (Ladybug or Ladybird in French).

=== Fourgonnette ===
The 2CV-based delivery vans introduced in the spring of 1951 differed from the sedan from the B-pillar onwards by having a box-like, spacious cargo area that could be loaded through two gullwing doors at the rear. The van was named "Fourgonnette" by Citroën.

In France and Switzerland, these vehicles were often to be found at the post office and small businesses, while in Germany the possibility of acquiring a mobile home at a reasonable price was the decisive factor for buyers. Technically, this variant went through almost the same development steps as the sedan.

Production of the delivery van, also known as the "box duck", was discontinued in mid-1978. At about the same time, the high-roof variant of the Dyane, the Acadiane, took its place.

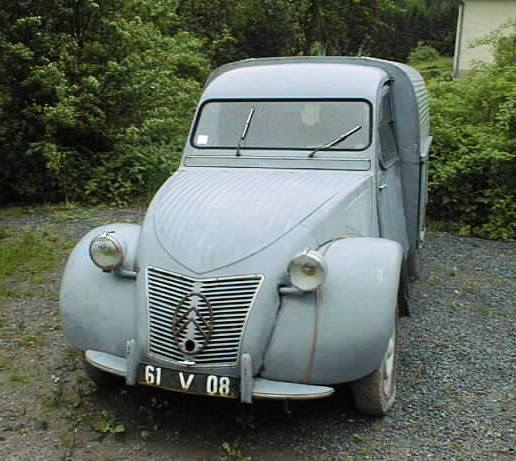
Citroën 2CV AU (1952)

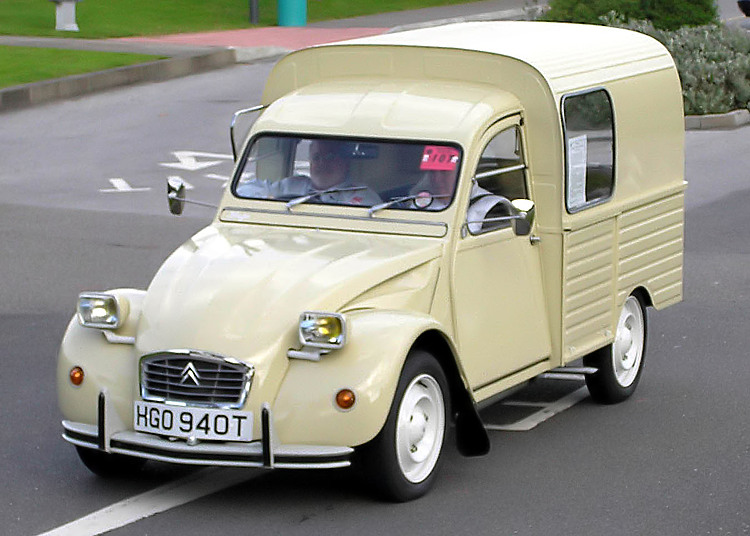
Citroën "Kasten-Ente" AK 400 (1978)

=== Non-factory ===
==== 4×4 ====
Various 4×4 conversions were built by independent constructors, such as Marc Voisin, near Grenoble, some from a Méhari 4×4 chassis and a 2CV body. In the UK, Louis Barbour builds single-engined four-wheel-drive 2CVs. In the late 1990s, Kate Humble from BBC Top Gear tested one against a Land Rover Defender off-road. The 2CV won.

Another very different double front-ended, four-wheel drive (but not at the same time) 2CV, the 1952 Citroën Cogolin, also known as the Bicéphale, was built for the French Fire Service—the Sapeur-Pompiers. This was meant to enable the car to drive into a narrow position and away again without having to turn.

==== Boot extensions ====
Some owners wished to have more luggage capacity in the 2CV sedan. Early 2CV could be fitted with a rounded aftermarket boot (trunk) lid, reminiscent of a post-war "big boot" Traction Avant. Some late model owners fitted an extension to the car's boot. This used the original boot lid and hinges, but in a horizontal position with the extension underneath.

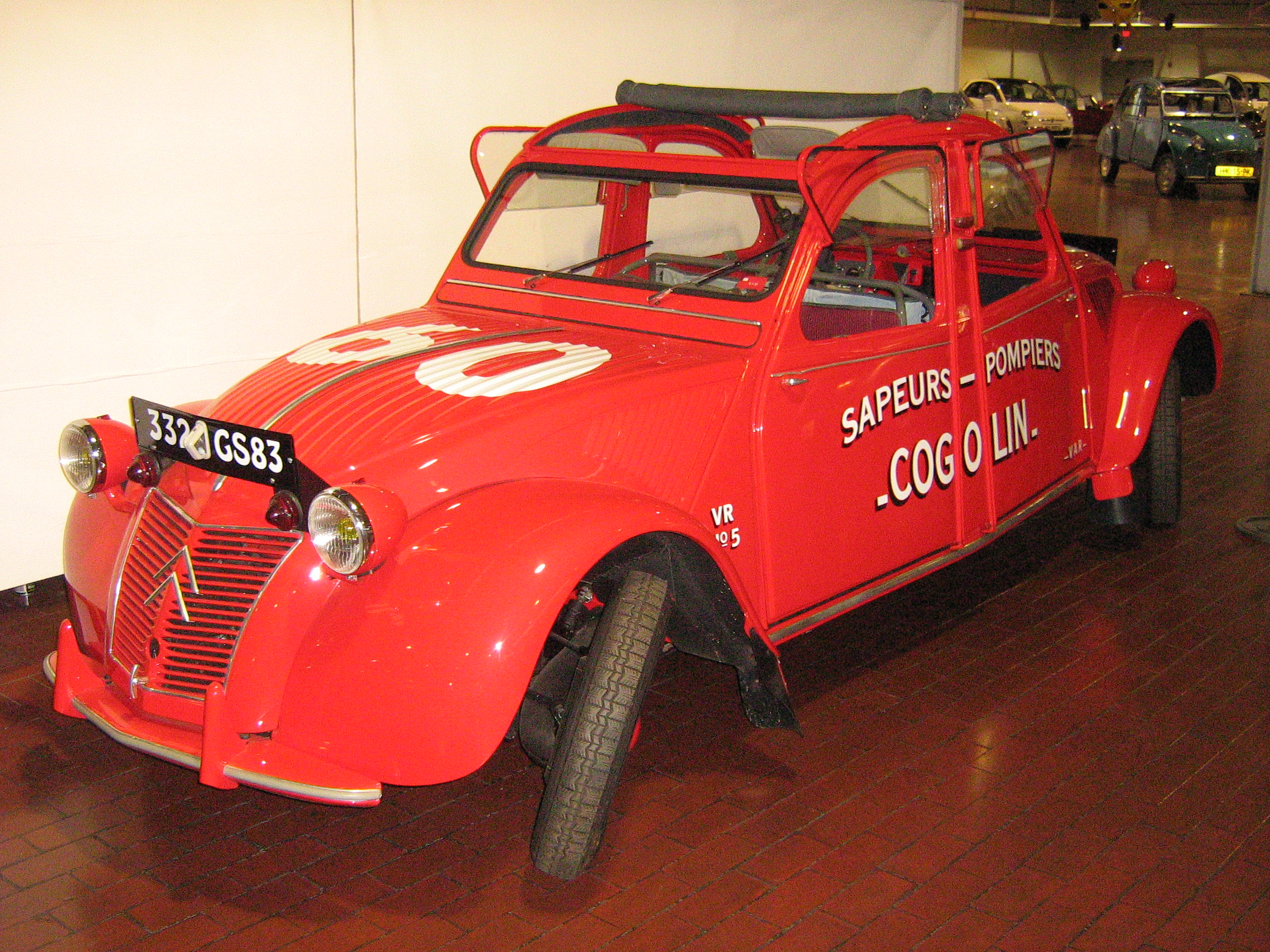
1952 Citroën Cogolin 4×4

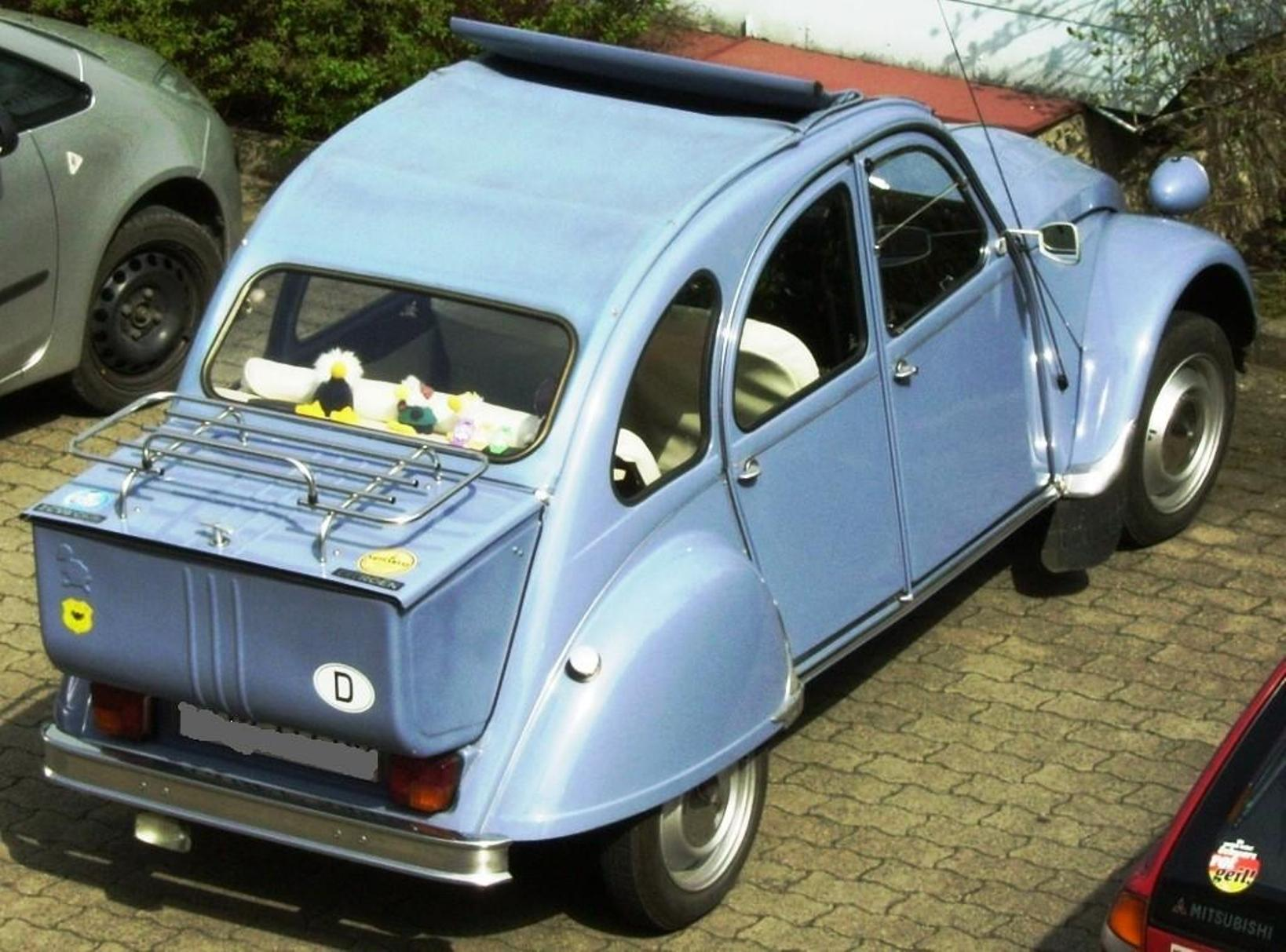
1970s/'80s-style boot extension

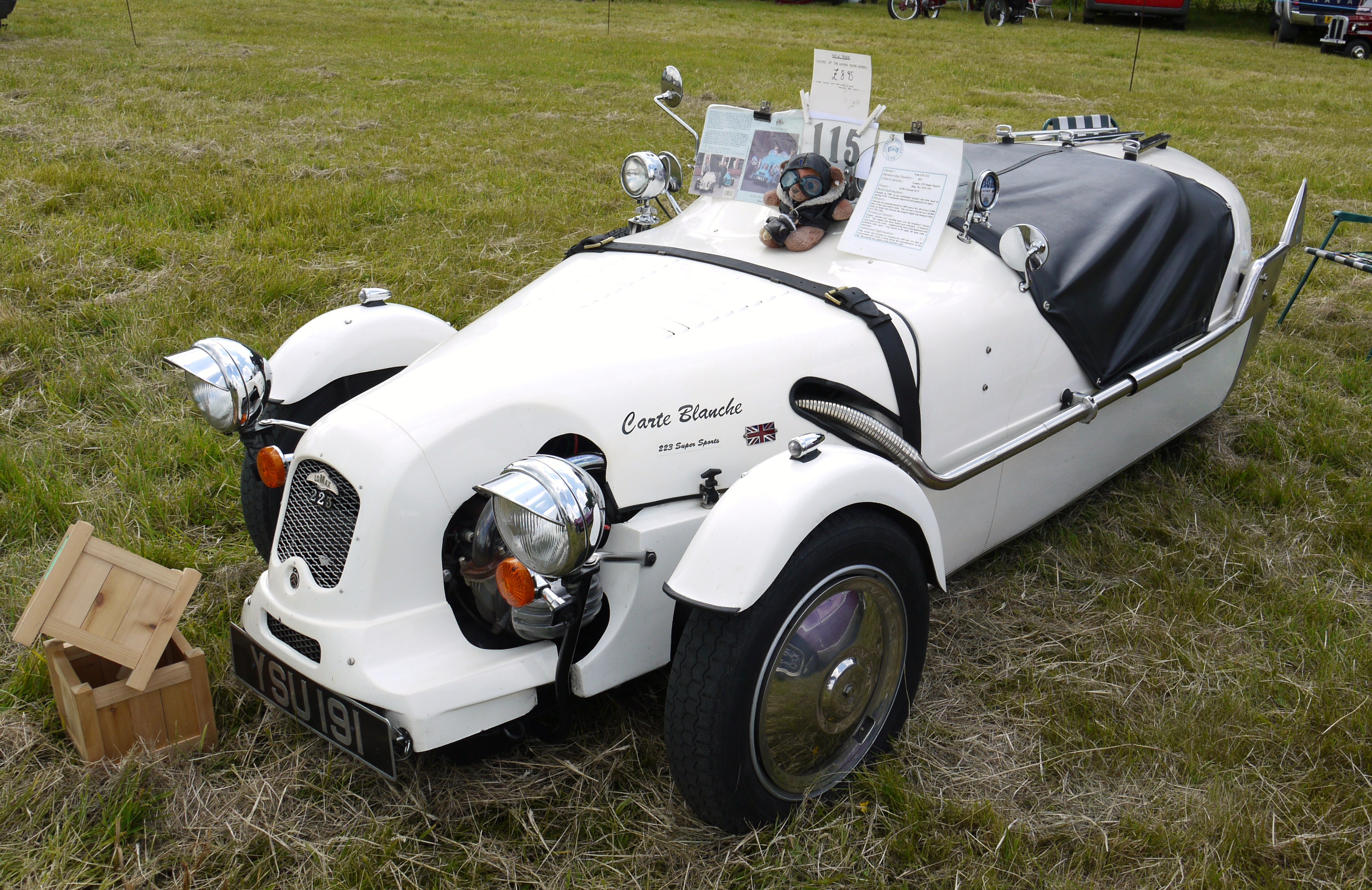
Lomax 223 3-wheeler kit car

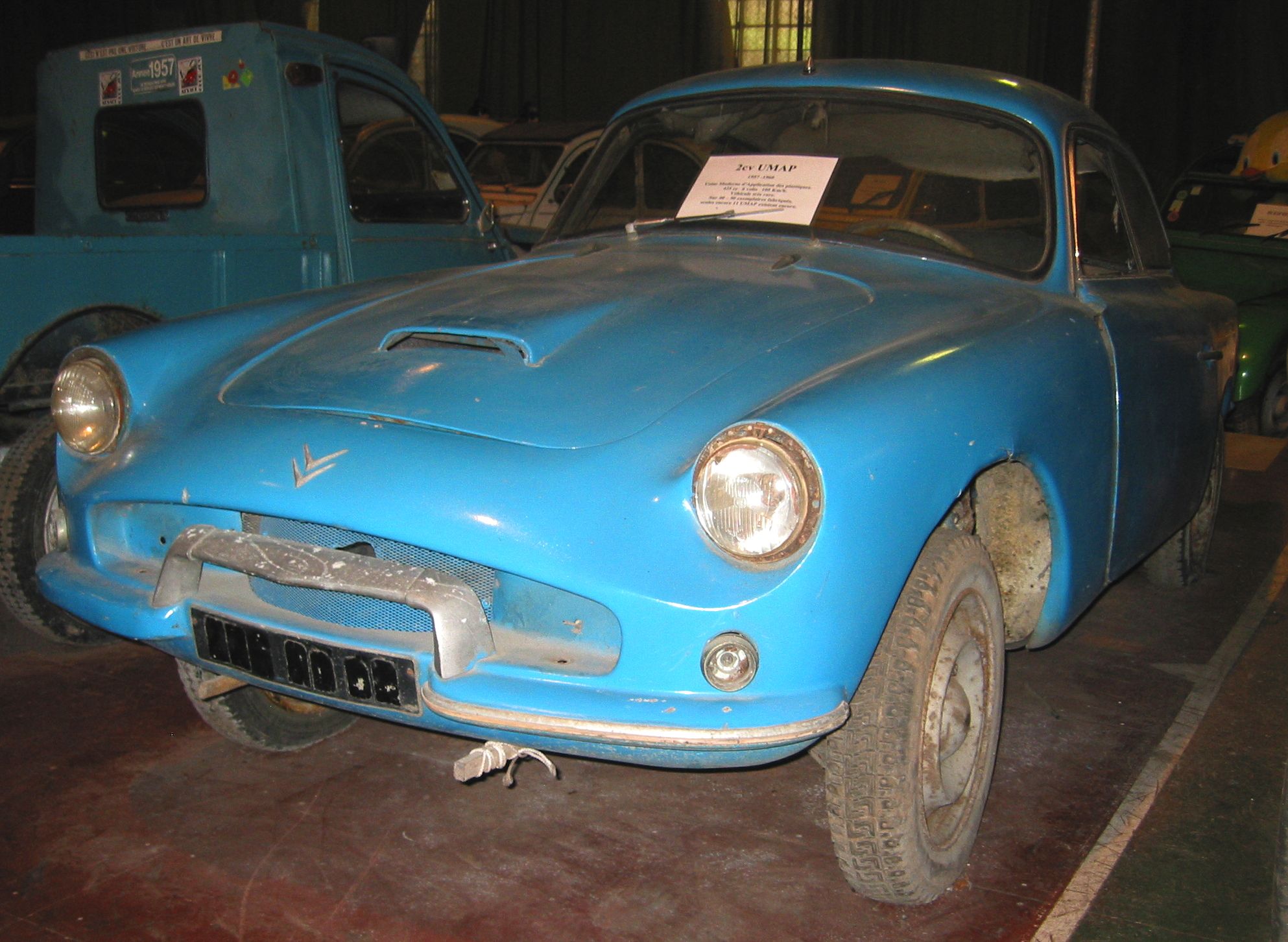
UMAP

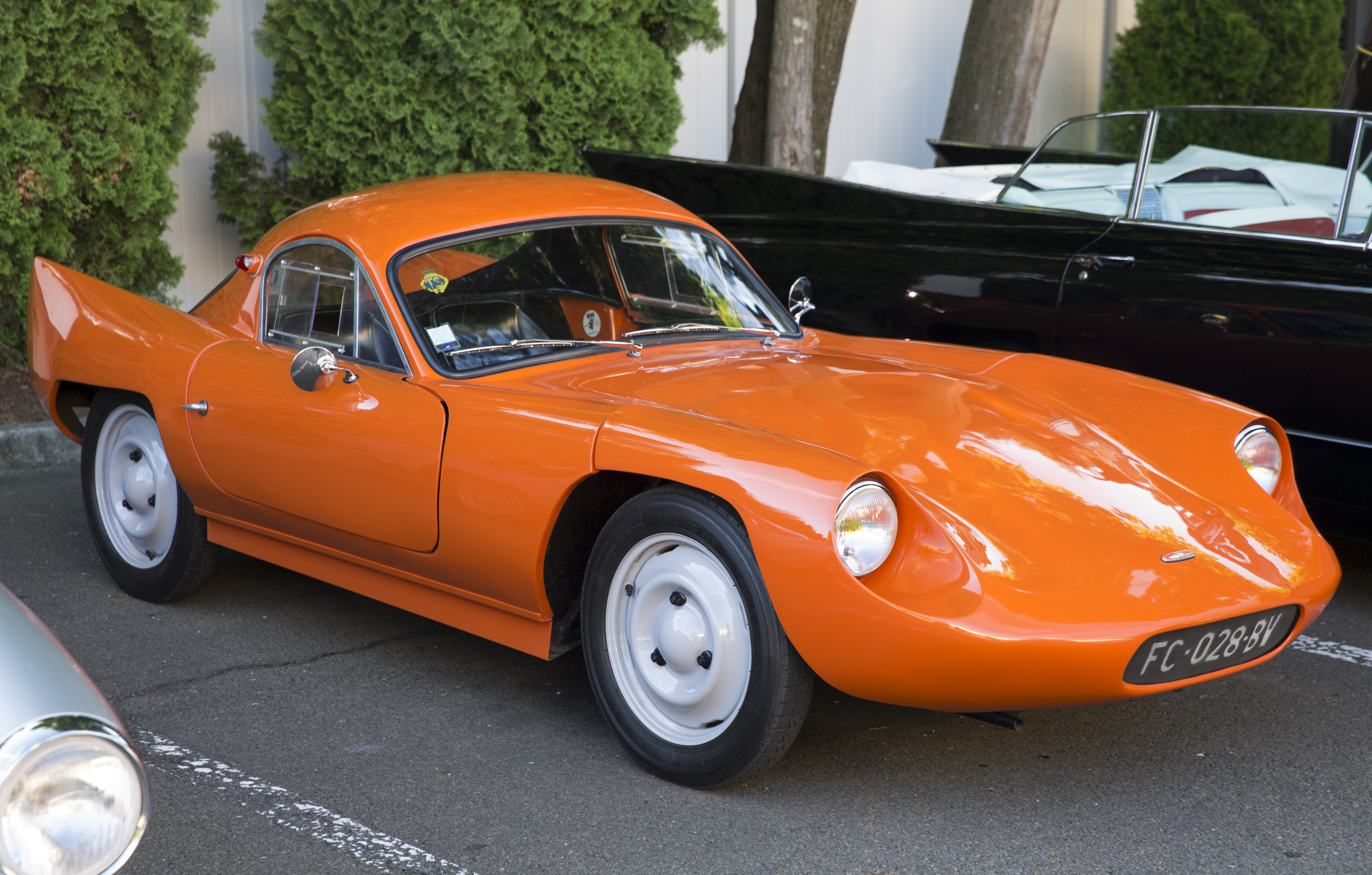
The fibreglass-bodied Mismaque Squal

==== Kit cars and specials ====
Examples of 2CV-based kit sports cars include the Pembleton, Blackjack Avion and the Lomax from Britain, and Burton and Patron from the Netherlands. Most are also available as three wheelers (single wheel at the rear), like an early Morgan sports car. Some have been fitted with larger air-cooled twin-cylinder motorcycle engines. The German Hoffmann 2CV is a two door convertible.

For transportation purposes, some saloon models were rebuilt into vans using fibreglass reconstructions of corrugated 2CV Fourgonnette rear box sections. The "Bedouin" was a flat-panel wooden-bodied kit car.

==== UMAP coupé ====
The small French company UMAP was established in 1956 in the northern French village of Bernon, (Aube) by Camille Martin, the former mayor. The acronym UMAP stands for Usine Moderne d'Applications Plastiques (Modern Factory for Plastic Applications). UMAP produced the SM 425 and SM 500 from 1957, two externally identical coupés based on the Citroën 2CV. In 1958 production was discontinued.

== 2000 CV Concept ==
In some parts of the mid 90s, Citroën secretly developed a modern iteration of 2CV. It also co-developed with Chrysler and rebadged as CCV (China Concept Vehicle), a same strategy to counter Volkswagen who offered an updated Beetle in that era, and Fiat who revived the 500 with their new take on the sub-compact classic. A CV concept design was demised into new C3. The CV 2000 concept was on public display at Citroën's 100th Anniversary Celebration at La Ferte Vidame France in 2019.

== 2026 CV Concept ==
At the 2026 Paris Motor Show, a concept version for a new 2CV was shown. The head of the design team, Antoine Gaillot-Drevon, stated that their aim wasn't to recreate the retro design, but to bring it into modern territory, insisting that unlike the 2000 concept, the model will go into production. It is expected to start sales in late 2028.

== Technical literature ==
The restoration, maintenance and repair of the Citroën 2CV have been covered in several technical manuals and publications, including:

- Citroën 2CV, Ami & Dyane (67–90) – Haynes Repair Manual, Haynes Publishing, 2013 (ISBN 978-0-85733-640-8);
- Revue Technique Automobile n° 297.9: Citroën 2CV (1979–1990), Éditions Techniques pour l’Automobile et l’Industrie (ETAI), 1999 (ISBN 978-2-7268-2979-0);
- Lindsay Porter, Restaurez, réparez votre Citroën 2CV, Sophia éditions, 2024 (ISBN 978-2-38514-079-3);
- Art de la Rénovation, Restore a 2CV: The Secrets of a Successful Restoration, Independently Published, 2024 (ISBN 979-8-30039-807-1).

== See also ==
- 2CV 24 Hour Race

== Sources ==
- Bellu, René (1979). Delville, Jean-Pierre (ed.). Toutes les Citroën, des origines à nos jours. J.-P. Delville. ISBN 978-2-85922-014-3.
- Broustail, Joël (2020). Citroën et le citroënisme: essai historique sur la passion automobile et l'innovation [Citroën and Citroenism: Essay on the History of Automobile and Innovation] (in French). Paris: Au Pont 9. ISBN 979-10-96310-60-9.
- Chapman, Giles (2009). Illustrated Encyclopedia of Extraordinary Automobiles. DK Publishing. ISBN 978-0-7566-9576-7.
- Clarke, R. M. (2000). Citroën 2CV Ultimate Portfolio. Brooklands Books. ISBN 978-1-85520-426-3.
- Reynolds, John (2005). The Citroën 2CV. Haynes. ISBN 978-1-84425-207-7.
- Reynolds, John (2006). The Classic Citroëns 1935–1975. McFarland & Company, Inc, Publishers. ISBN 978-0-7864-2171-8.
- Setright, L. J. K. (2004). Drive On!: A Social History of the Motor Car. Granta. ISBN 978-1-86207-698-3.
- Willson, Quentin (1995). The Ultimate Classic Car Book. DK Publishing, Inc. ISBN 978-0-7894-0159-5.
