= Production data of the Citroën 2CV =

The Citroën 2CV (French: "deux chevaux" i.e. "deux chevaux-vapeur" is an air-cooled front-engine, front-wheel-drive economy car introduced at the 1948 Paris Salon de l'Automobile and manufactured by Citroën for model years 1948–1990. This page excludes production data for the mechanically similar Citroën Ami, Citroën Dyane, Citroën Acadiane, Citroën Méhari, Citroën Bijou, and Citroën FAF models.

== Production data by year ==
Model	1949	1950	1951	1952	1953	1954	1955	1956	1957	1958	1959	1960	1961	1962	1963	1964	1965	1966	1967	1968	1969	1970	1971	1972	1973	1974	1975	1976	1977	1978	1979	1980	1981	1982	1983	1984	1985	1986	1987	1988	1989	1990	Total
2CV Saloon	876	6,196	14,592	21,124	34,361	52,791	81,170	95,864	107,250	126,332	145,973	152,801	158,659	144,759	158,035	167,419	154,023	168,357	98,683	54,473	72,044	121,096	121,264	133,530	123,819	163,143	122,542	134,396	132,458	108,825	101,222	89,994	89,472	86,060	59,673	54,923	54,067	56,633	43,255	22,717	19,077	9,954	3,867,932
2CV Van	None	None	1,696	7,711	13,121	19,197	23,904	23,859	31,431	37,631	50,058	57,724	56,639	54,191	55,775	64,994	59,211	55,817	55,281	51,545	53,259	46,485	62,074	64,592	68,357	64,235	44,821	54,533	52,721	12,647	2,535	135	30	None	None	None	None	None	None	None	None	None	1,246,299
2CV Sahara	None	None	None	None	None	None	None	None	None	None	None	20	274	112	87	138	35	27	None	None	None	None	1	None	None	None	None	None	None	None	None	None	None	None	None	None	None	None	None	None	None	None	694

== Engines ==
Variant	Bore × Stroke (mm)	Displacement (cc)	Compression ratio	Carburettor	Power HP/rpm	Torque Nm/rpm	Application	Years produced
A-2CV	62×62	375	6.2	Solex 22ZACI	9/3500	19.6/2000	Citroën 2CV A	1948–56
A-2CV	62×62	375	6.2	Solex 22ZACI	9/3500	19.6/2000	Citroën 2CV Fourgonnette AU	1951–56
A-2CV	62×62	375	7	Solex 22ZACI	9/3500	19.6/2000	Citroën 2CV A	1956–59
A53	66×62	425	6.2	Solex 26CBI	12/3500	19.6/2000	Citroën 2CV AZ	1954–56
A53	66×62	425	6.2	Solex 26CBI	12/3500	19.6/2000	Citroën 2CV AZU	1954–63
A53	66×62	425	7	Solex 26CBI	12/3500	19.6/2000	Citroën 2CV AZ, AZL, AZLM	1956–60
A53	66×62	425	7	Solex 26CBI	12.5/4200	19.6/2000	Citroën 2CV AZ, AZL, AZLM	1960–61
A53	66×62	425	7.5	Solex 26CBI	13.5/4000	19.6/2000	Citroën 2CV AZ, AZL, AZLM	1961–62
A53	66×62	425	7.5	Solex 26CBI	15/4500	26.5/2500	Citroën 2CV AZ, AZL, AZLM	1962–63
A53	66×62	425	7.5	Solex 28CBI	18/5000	26.5/2500	Citroën 2CV AZA, AZAM Export	1963–67
A53	66×62	425	7.75	Solex 28CBI	18/5000	28.5/3500	Citroën 2CV AZA	1967–70
A53	66×62	425	7.75	Solex 28CBI	18/5000	28.5/3500	Citroën 2CV AZU	1963–67
A79/0	66×62	425	7.75	Solex 32	21/5450	29.4/2400	Citroën Dyane 4	1967–68
A79/0	66×62	425	7.75	Solex 32	21/5450	29.4/2400	Citroën 2CV AZU	1967–73
A79/1	68.5×59	435	8.5	Solex 34	26/6750	30.4/4000	Citroën 2CV 4	1970–79
A79/1	68.5×59	435	8.5	Solex 34	26/6750	30.4/4000	Citroën Dyane 4	1968–75
A79/1	68.5×59	435	8.5	Solex 34	26/6750	30.4/4000	Citroën 2CV AZU250	1972–77
M4	74×70	602	7.5	Solex 30PBI	21/4500	39.5/3500	Citroën Ami 6	1961–63
M4	74×70	602	7.5	Solex 30PBI	21/4500	39.5/3500	Citroën Dyane 6	1968
M4	74×70	602	7.5	Solex 30PBI	21/4500	39.5/3500	Citroën 2CV AK350	1963–68
M4	74×70	602	7.75	Solex 40PICS	25.5/4750	42/3000	Citroën Ami 6	1963–68
M28/1	74×70	602	8.5	Solex 34	32.8/5750	42/3500	Citroën 2CV 6	1970–78
M28/1	74×70	602	8.5	Solex 34	32.8/5750	42/3500	Citroën Dyane 6	1968–70
M28/1	74×70	602	8.5	Solex 34	32.8/5750	42/3500	Citroën Méhari	1968–78
M28/1	74×70	602	8.5	Solex 34	32.8/5750	42/3500	Citroën FAF	1973–78
M28/1	74×70	602	8.5	Solex 34	32.8/5750	42/3500	Citroën Acadiane	1978–87
M28	74×70	602	9	Solex 26/35	32/5750	46.4/3500	Citroën Dyane 6	1970–83
M28	74×70	602	9	Solex 26/35	32/5750	46.4/3500	Citroën Ami 8	1969–78
M28	74×70	602	8.5	Solex 26/35	32/5750	41/3500	Citroën LN	1976–78
M28	74×70	602	8.5	Solex 26/35	29/5750	39/3500	Citroën 2CV 6	1979–90
V06	77×70	652	9.5	Solex 26/35 CSIC	35/5750	52/3500	Citroën LN	1978–86
V06	77×70	652	9.5	Solex 26/35 CSIC	35/5750	49/3500	Citroën Visa Club	1978–87

=== Standard saloon ===
Production data
Model range	Official code	Production dates	Sales description	Engine cc
2CV	A	07/49 – 07/59	2CV	375
	AZ	10/54 – 10/55	2CV	425
	AZ	10/55 – 10/58	2CV	425
	AZ	10/58 – 10/61	2CV	425
	AZ	10/61 – 04/62	2CV	425
	AZ	04/62 – 02/63	2CV	425
	AZ (séries A et AM)	03/63 – 12/63	2CV AZL & AZAM	425
	AZ (séries A et AM)	12/63 – 02/70	2CV AZL & AZAM	425
	AZ (séries A 2)	02/70 – 09/75	2CV 4	435
	AZ (série KB)	09/75 – 09/78	2CV 4	435
	AZ (série KB)	09/78 – 07/79	2CV Spécial	435
	AZ (série KA)	02/70 – 09/75	2CV 6	602
	AZ (série KA)	09/75 – 09/78	2CV 6	602
	AZ (série KA)	09/78 – 07/79	2CV 6	602
	AZ (série KA)	07/79 – 07/81	2CV 6 Spécial, Club	602
	AZ (série KA)	07/81 – 07/90	2CV Spécial, Club, Spécial E, Charleston	602

=== Utility ===
Production data
Model range	Official code	Production dates	Sales description	Engine cc
2CV Fourgonnette	AU	03/51 – 10/54	2CV – AU	375
	AZU	10/54 – 12/55	2CV – AZU	425
	AZU	12/55 – 10/58	2CV – AZU	425
	AZU	10/58 – 11/61	2CV – AZU	425
	AZU	11/61 – 02/62	2CV – AZU	425
	AZU	02/62 – 03/63	2CV – AZU	425
	AZU (série A)	03/63 – 08/67	2CV – AZU (séries A )	425
	AZU (série A)	08/67 – 08/72	2CV – AZU (séries A )	425
	AZ (série B)	08/72 – 09/75	Citroën 250	435
	AZ série AP (AZU)	09/75 – 02/78	Citroën 250	435
3CV Fourgonnette	AK	04/63 – 05/68	AK 350	602
	AK (série B)	05/68 – 08/70	AK 350	602
	AK (série AK)	08/70 – 09/75	Citroën 400	602
	AK (série AK)	09/75 – 02/78	Citroën 400	602
	AK (série CD)	02/78 – 09/80	Acadiane	602
	AK (série CD)	09/80 – 07/87	Acadiane	602
	AK (série CD modifie)	09/80 – 07/87	Acadiane G.P.L (L.P.G.)	602

=== Sahara ===
Production data
Model range	Official code	Production dates	Sales description	Engine cc
2CV 4×4	AW	03/58 – 03/63	2CV 4 × 4 "SAHARA"	2 × 425
2CV 4×4	AW/AT	03/63 – 07/66	2CV 4 × 4 "SAHARA"	2 × 425

== Sources ==
- Reynolds, John (2005). The Citroën 2CV. Haynes. ISBN 978-1-84425-207-7.
