= Citroën E-Méhari =

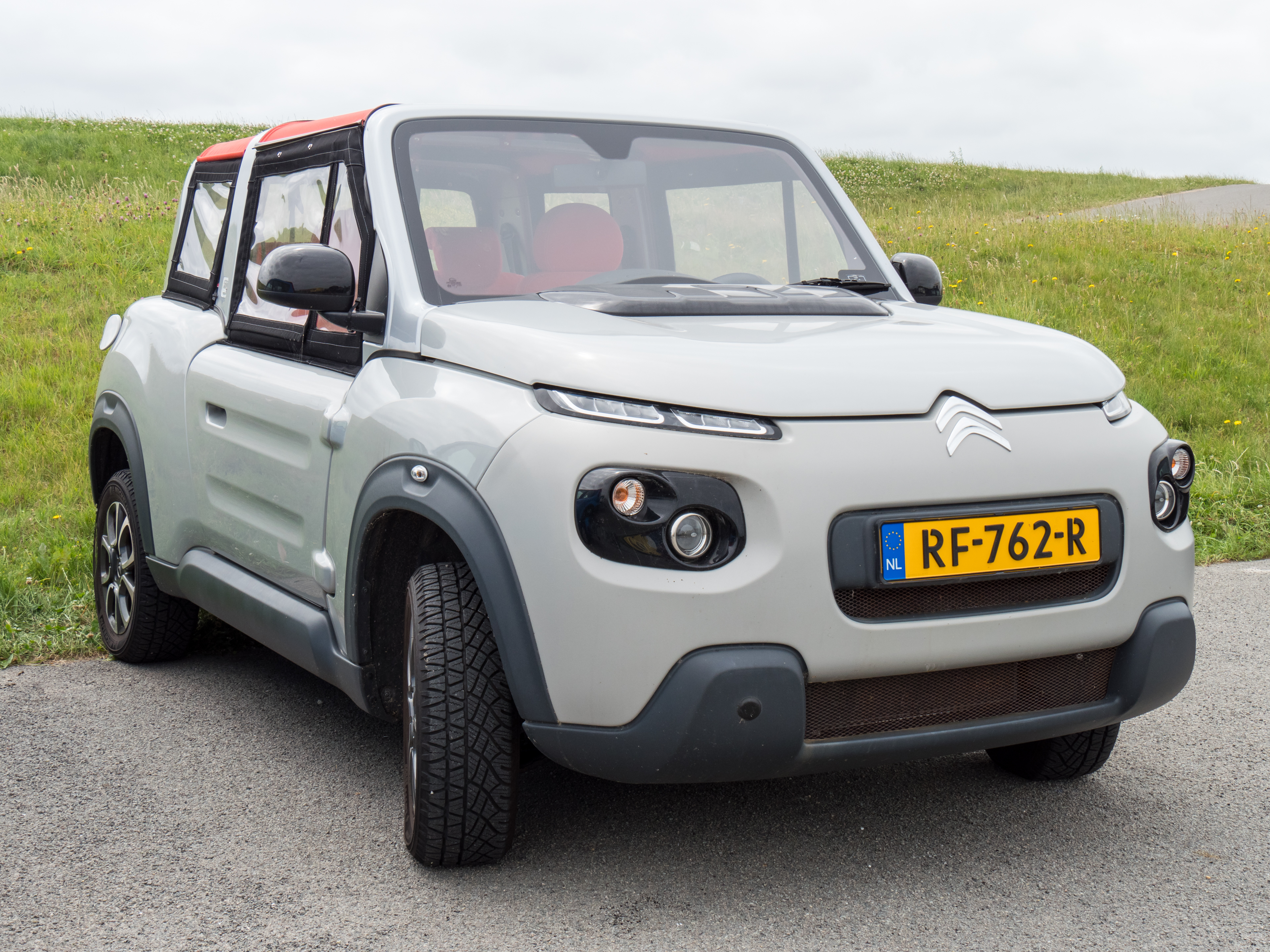

Overview
- Manufacturer: Citroën
- Production: 2016–2019 (1,000 produced)
- Model years: 2017–2019
- Assembly: France: Rennes (PSA Rennes Plant)
- Designer: Pierre Authier

Body and chassis
- Class: Mini SUV
- Body style: 2-door convertible SUV
- Layout: Front-engine, front-wheel-drive
- Platform: Blue Summer
- Related: Bolloré Bluesummer; Citroën C4 Cactus

Powertrain
- Electric motor: 50 kW (68 PS; 67 hp)
- Transmission: 1-speed fixed-gear
- Battery: 30 kWh lithium polymer
- Electric range: 200 km (120 mi) NEDC (urban); 100 km (62 mi) (extra-urban)
- Plug-in charging: 13 hours on home socket (10A), 8 hours on 16A

Dimensions
- Wheelbase: 2,430 mm (95.7 in)
- Length: 3,809 mm (150.0 in)
- Width: 1,728 mm (68.0 in)
- Height: 1,653 mm (65.1 in)
- Curb weight: 1,405 kg (3,097 lb)

Chronology
- Predecessor: Citroën Méhari; Citroën FAF; Citroën Bijou; Citroën C3 Pluriel

The Citroën E-Méhari is a limited-production electric off-road subcompact SUV produced by the French car maker Citroën from 2016. Approximately 1,000 cars were planned to be produced in collaboration with the French electric car producer Bolloré. Sales began in France in spring 2016 with pricing starting at €25,000 excluding the battery leasing. It reaches a top speed of 110 km/h (68 mph) and accelerates 0–50 km/h (0–31 mph) in 6.4 seconds.

The E-Mehari is based on the Bolloré Bluesummer, and references the original Citroën Méhari from 1968 in both name and design, featuring a fabric roof and hose down interior. Citroën were reported to be concentrating sales on the rental car market in Southern Europe, particularly around coastal areas.

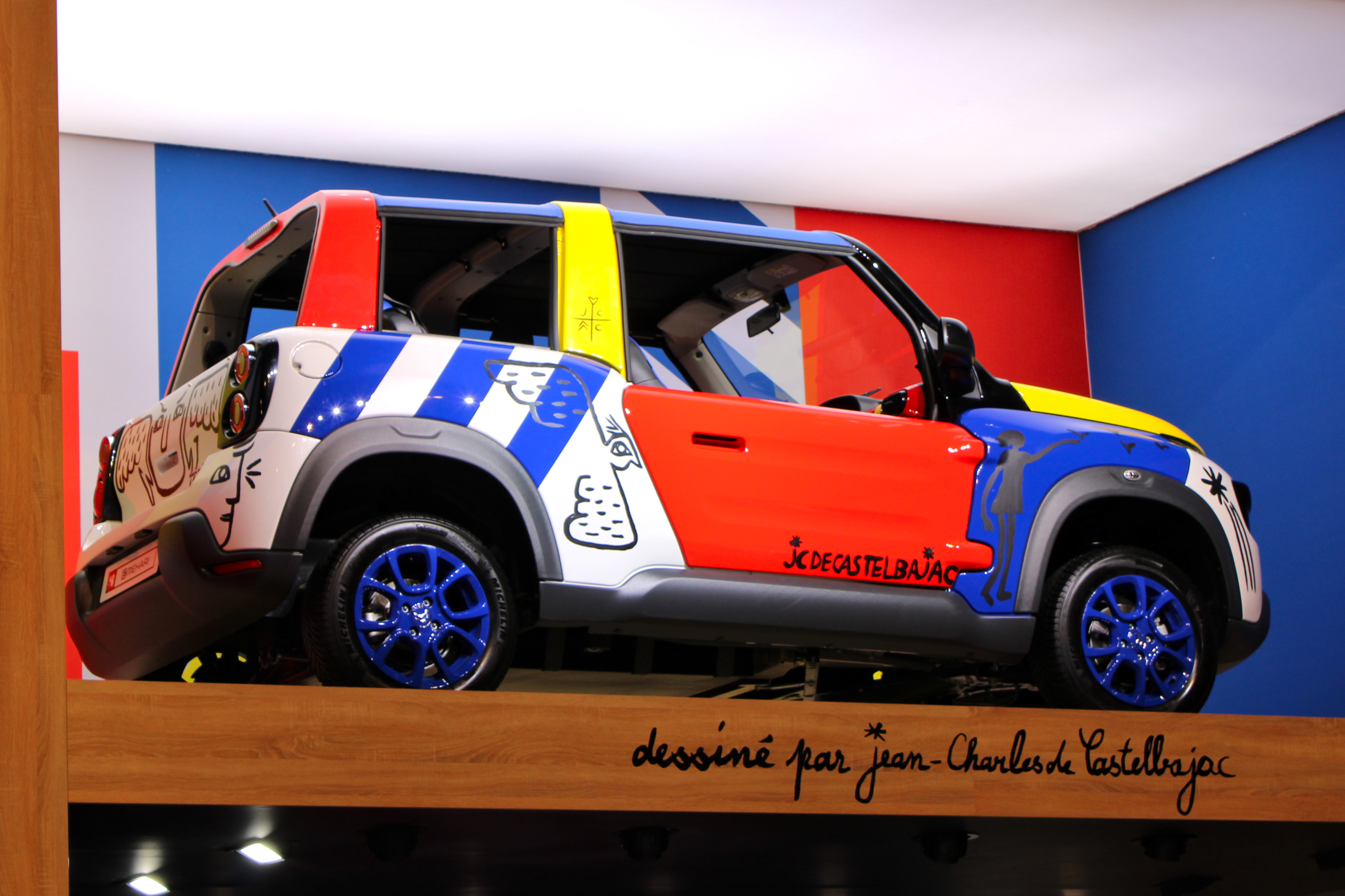
Art Car by Jean-Charles de Castelbajac
