= Baby-Brousse =

Citroen utility vehicle

The Baby-Brousse is a Citroën 2CV-based utility vehicle, initially privately built, that later spawned the FAF series of vehicles.

Similar to a metal-bodied Citroën Méhari, the Baby-Brousse was a success with more than 31,000 being built from 1963 to 1987. The entire body was made of folded sheet metal with the other parts being bolted together without welding.

== Background ==
The Citroën 2CV baby bush finish was produced in Ivory Coast between 1963–1979 in 1,320 examples. This vehicle comes from the imagination of Maurice Delignon, a craftsman in Abidjan and passionate hunter. He is having his 2 CV AZL transformed to make it more usable in the bush. The concept will then be industrialized by another expatriate, Jacques Deniau. Industrialization began in 1968 at the Ateliers et Forges de l'Ebrié in Abidjan, whose owners were two Frenchmen, MM. Letoquin and Lechanteur, with engines and chassis imported from mainland France.

== Sales figures ==
Baby Brousse-type vehicles have been made and sold under different names in several places:

- Baby Brousse in Ivory Coast (1963–1979), 1,320 built.
- SAIPAC Jyane-Mehari in Iran (1970–1979), 9,315 vehicles.
- Citroën Yagán in Chile (1973–1976), 651 examples (or 1,500 examples).
- Indonesia Baby Brousse 480 & FAF 600
- Central African Republic Baby Brousse 180 & FAF 60.
- Namco Pony in Thessalonika, Greece (1974–1983), built with Dyane 6 components in a specifically built factory. These had better build quality and equipment than others. 30,000 examples were built (16,680 according to Marie & Étienne Christian). The Pony was the only Baby Brousse exported to the United States.
- Mehari in Senegal & Guinea Bissau (1979–1983), ± 500 vehicles.
- Vietnam Citroën La Dalat (1969–1975) was manufactured, with 3,850 examples produced. Its creator, Jacques Duchemin, proposed the FAF concept to Citroën when he returned to France after the fall of Saigon.
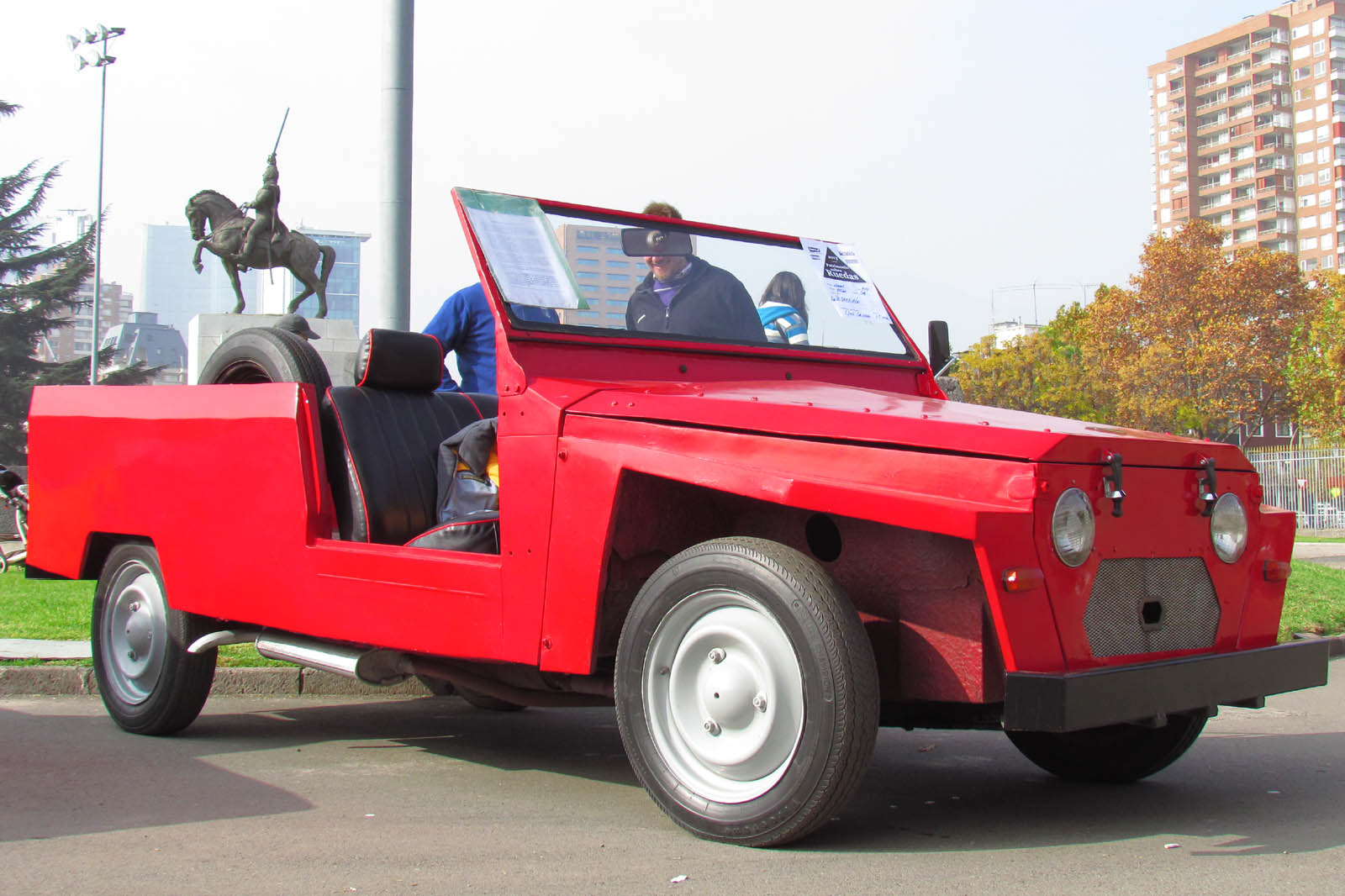
Citroën Yagán in Santiago, Chile

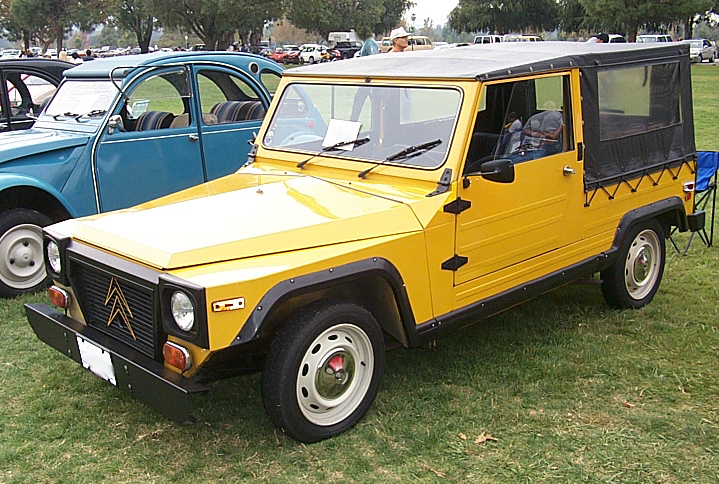
Namco Pony - U.S. Model

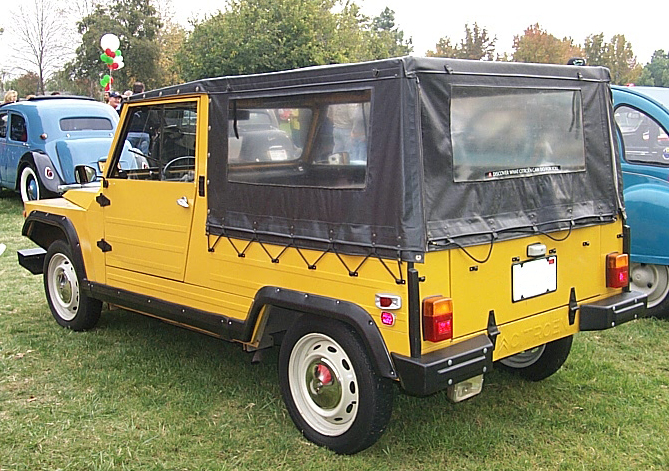
Pony rear

== FAF ==
The first FAFs were built in 1977, at the Citroën plant in Mangualde, Portugal.

== Other ==
In Argentina: Savoiacars, has prepared some cars based on the Méhari, with improved platform and engine, and another with a body of their own design.

Various kit car style bodies were also developed, inspired by the Méhari, such as Belgium's VanClee.
