= Stellantis Mangualde Plant =

Portuguese car manufacturing and assembly plant

Coordinates: 40.6075°N 7.7779°W

Peugeot Citroen Automóveis Portugal S.A
- Industry: Automotive industry
- Founded: 1962
- Founder: José Coelho dos Santos, Citroën
- Headquarters: Mangualde, Viseu, Portugal
- Products: Citroën Berlingo; Peugeot Partner/Rifter; Opel/Vauxhall Combo; Fiat Doblò
- Owner: Stellantis
- Number of employees: 700
- Website: site.groupe-psa.com/mangualde/pt-pt

The Stellantis Mangualde Plant, also known as CPMG (Centro de Produção de Mangualde) is an automotive assembly plant located in the city of Mangualde, Portugal, near Viseu. It produces Citroën Berlingo, Peugeot Partner/Rifter, Opel Combo/Combo Life, Fiat Doblò and Vauxhall Combo in conjunction with the Stellantis Vigo Plant.

== History ==
The plant was founded in 1962 and began operations in 1964 with the production of Citroën 2CV (AZL). José Coelho dos Santos, a Portuguese industrialist, purchased a license to manufacture automobiles in 1962, which was later acquired by Citroën. Its first vehicle was the model AZL, popularly known as Citroën 2CV. They produced 472 cars that year.

The millionth car produced at the plant was manufactured in 2012.

=== Timeline ===
- 1963: Purchase of 12,130 m^{2} (130,600 sq ft) of land; the factory covered an area of 8,150 m^{2} (87,700 sq ft).
- 1964: First vehicle, the Citroën AZL.
- 1967: Purchase of land for the Administration building (Accounting and Administrative Management).
- 1969: Production reached 10 vehicles per day, across multiple models: AZL, AZU, AK, H, AMY, DS, AY and MHA.
- 1976: Production reached 35 vehicles day (four models).
- 1977: First vehicles for export, a Citroën FAF.
- 1980: Existing warehouse area increased, purchase and construction of a parking area for customs-cleared vehicles and construction of Surface Treatment (TTS) and Anti-Corrosion Treatment (Trempé Epoxy).
- 1984: Increased warehouse space. Fatal fire, on May 3, in the building of upholstery and wiring.
- 1987: Twenty-fifth anniversary. Major Citroën reorganization.
- 1990: Manufacture of AX and production of 50 vehicles per day. Installations for wiring and fitting and installation of a new and better anti-corrosion system: the "Cataphorèse". In July, the last 2CV was built.
- 1994: New upholstery section.
- 1995: Renewal of Painting with the construction of the primary greenhouse. Certified by UTAC with the classification of A95.
- 1996: Creation of the second Team. Beginning of Citroën Saxo production.
- 1998: Production of first Generation Citroën Berlingo and Peugeot Partner
- 2000: Third shift
- 2001: Gold medal of the city of Mangualde.
- 2002: New painting retouching boxes. Construction of the Bout d'Usine building.
- 2003: Transfer of administrative services and canteen to a new building. Construction of the Bout d'Usine / Pier Hardware / Line Engines.
- 2006: Construction of the CKD building.
- 2009: Second generation Citroën Berlingo and Peugeot Partner.
- 2010: Participation in the construction of the "2CV" roundabout at the city entrance
- 2011: Construction of 3 car parks and EN16 (National Highway Nº16) integration.
- 2012: 1,000,000 vehicles produced. 50th anniversary.
- 2015: Announcement of the award for the production of the new model for 2018.

== Daily production ==
Year	1995	1997	2000	2005	2006	2007	2008	2009	2010	2011	2012	2013	2014	2015	2016	2017	2018	2019
Production	60	131	218	237	270	278	285	162	167	251	186	288	200	210	220			330

== Annual production ==
Year	1970	1980	1985	1990	1998	2000	2007	2008	2009	2010	2011	2012	2013	2014	2015	2016	2017	2018	2019
Production	2,779	6,691	8,645	13,900	27,776	49,753	64,065	61,530	34,500	47,400	50,250	44,000	56,700	53,500	46,600	49,700	53,600	63,000	77,607

Year	2020
Production	64658

– Sources:

== Current production ==
- Citroën Berlingo/Berlingo Van Mk3(K9) (2018-present)
- Peugeot Partner/Rifter Mk3 (K9) (2018-present)
- Opel Combo E/Combo Life (K9) (2018-present)
- Fiat Doblò (October 2022-present))

== Former production ==
Prior production:

- Citroën 2CV (AZL) (1964 – 27, July, 1990)
- Citroën 2CV Fourgonette (AZU) (1964 – 1970)
- Citroën 2CV Fourgonette (AK) (1965 – 1976)
- Citroën H Van (1965 – 1976)
- Citroën Ami (1965 – 1976)
- Citroën DS (1966 – 1975)
- Citroën Dyane (AY) (1967 – 1983)
- Citroën Méhari (MHA) (1969 – 1983)
- Citroën GS (1970 – 1976)
- Citroën FAF (1977 – 1982)
- Citroën CX (1979 – 1982)
- Citroën GSA (1980 – 1981)
- Citroën Visa (1981 – 1987)
- Citroën AX (1990 – 1998)
- Citroën Saxo (1996 – 2000)
- Citroën Berlingo / Peugeot Partner Mk1 (M59) (1998 – 2011)
- Peugeot Partner Mk2 (B9) (2009 – 2018)
- Citroën Berlingo Mk2 (B9) (2009 – 2018)

== See also ==
- Groupe PSA
- Citroën
