= Van Veen (motorcycle) =

Van Veen OCR 1000
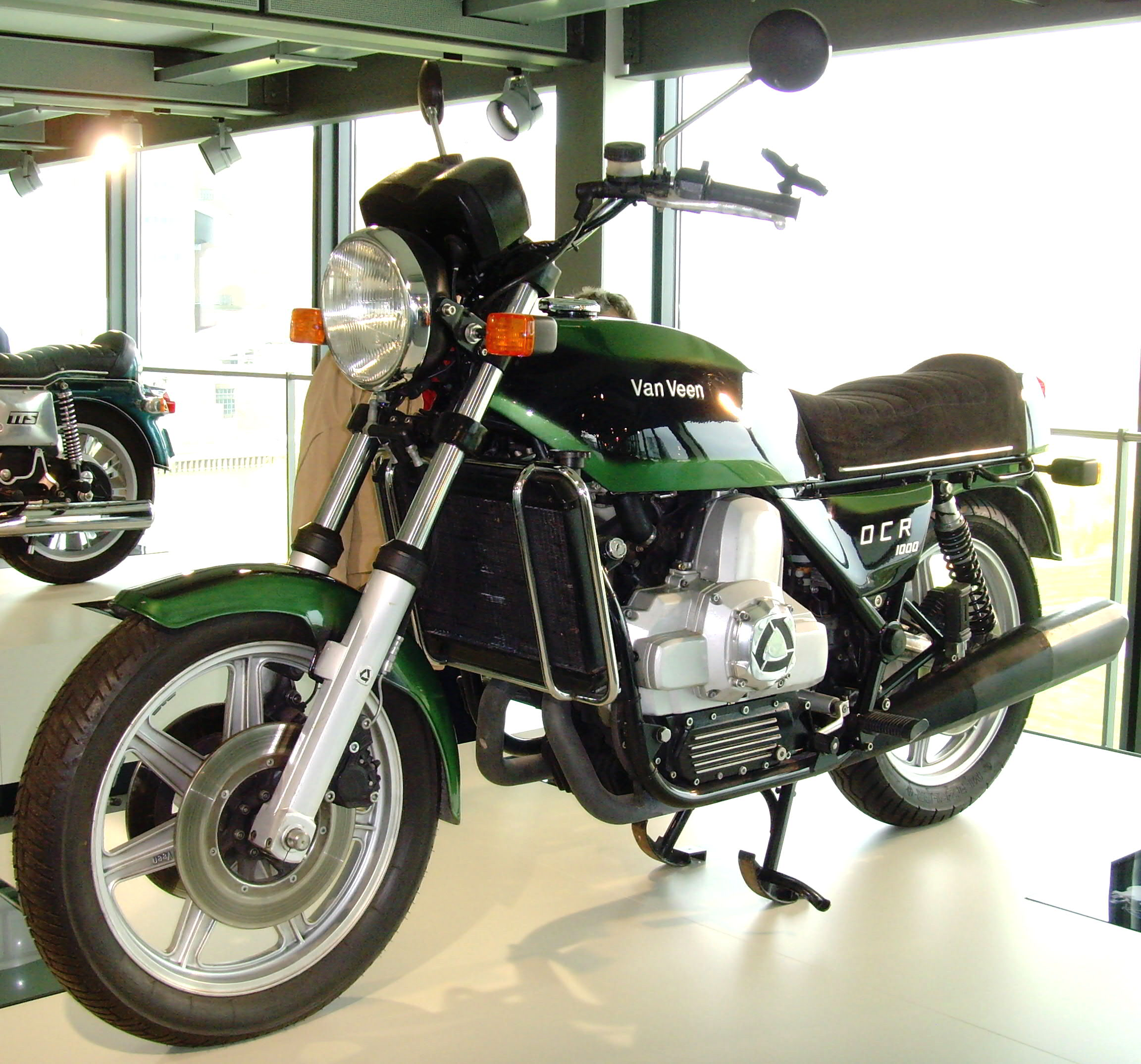
- Van Veen OCR 1000 1977 using a re-purposed engine originally intended for the Citroën GS, exhibited at Autostadt, in Wolfsburg, Germany
- Manufacturer: Henk van Veen
- Engine: 996 cc (60.8 cu in)
- Top speed: 135 mph (claimed)
- Power: 75 kW (100 hp)@ 6,500 rpm (rear wheel)
- Transmission: 4-speed shaft drive
- Suspension: Front 42 mm telescopic fork Rear twin shocks w/adjustable preload and damping
- Tires: Front:110/90 x 18in Rear:130/80 x 18in
- Wheelbase: 1,500 mm (61 in)
- Seat height: 850 mm (33.5 in)
- Weight: 291 kg (642 lb) (dry); 294 kilograms (648 lb) (2011) (wet)
- Fuel capacity: 24 L; 5.2 imp gal (6.3 US gal)
- Fuel consumption: 9.8 L/100 km; 29 mpg_{‑imp} (24 mpg_{‑US}) (est.)

Van Veen or Van Veen Kreid is a former motorcycle manufacturer. It was founded in Amsterdam by Henk van Veen, the Dutch importer of Kreidler motorcycles.

Van Veen completed its first prototype in 1974 using a 1000 cc Comotor 624 twin-rotor Wankel engine, and in November 1974 it was exhibited at the Cologne motorcycle show with front and rear cast wheels and triple Brembo disc brakes.

Limited production of the OCR 1000 model began in 1978 and ceased in 1981, after poor press reviews and complications with Comotor engine production. As well as problems with the Comotor engine, weight (700 lbs/320 kg) and price ($US15,000) also contributed to lack of sales. 38 examples were built.

By 2011, the leftover OCR 1000 parts had been purchased by Andries Wielinga, who built 10 complete motorcycles for sale.
