= Citroën M35 =

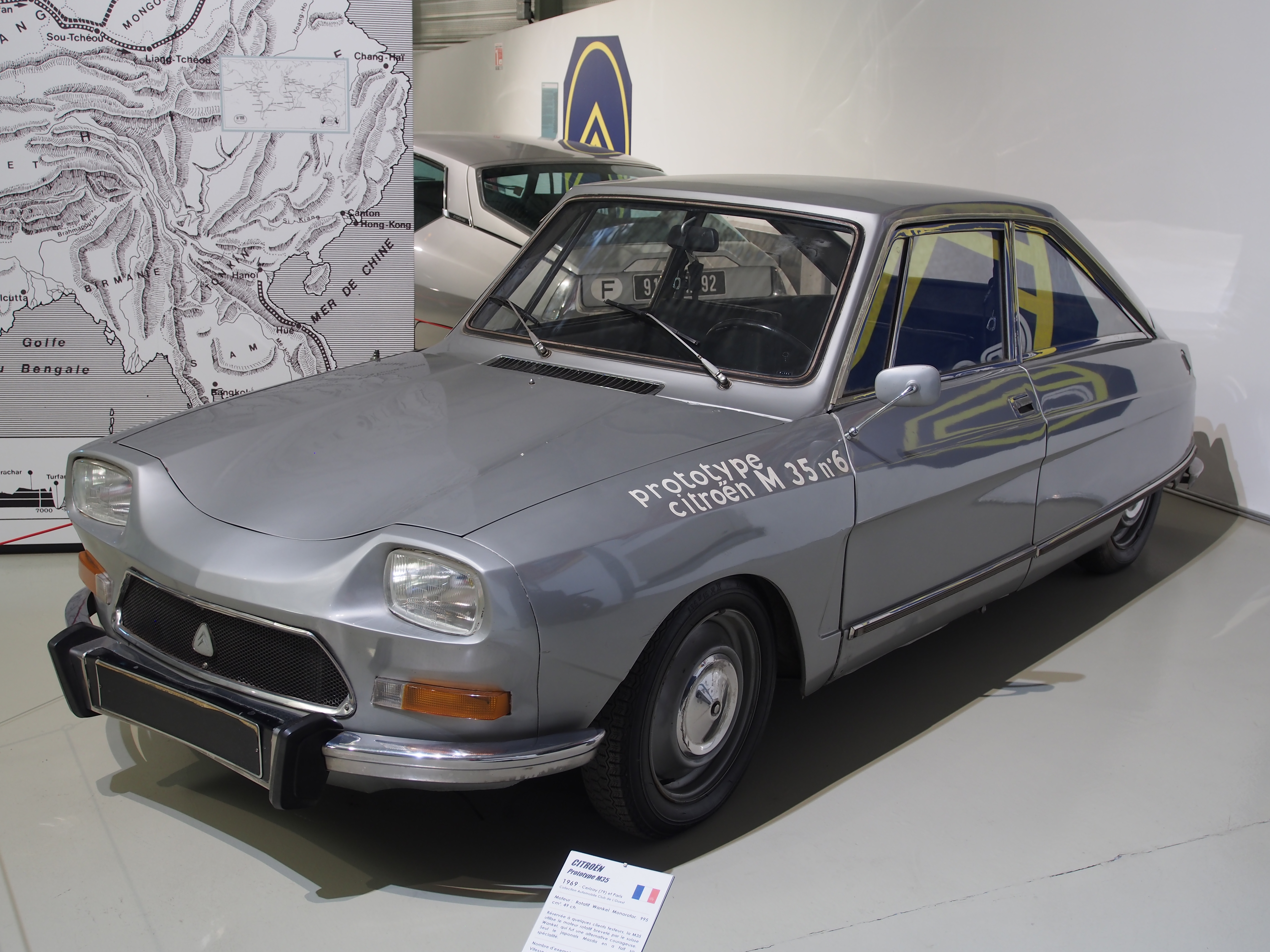

Overview
- Manufacturer: Citroën
- Production: 1969–1971; 267 produced
- Assembly: France: Cerizay (Heuliez)

Body and chassis
- Class: Supermini (B)
- Body style: 2-door coupé
- Layout: FF layout
- Related: Ami 8

Powertrain
- Engine: Comotor 498 cc with single rotor

Chronology
- Successor: Citroën LNA

The Citroën M35 is a coupé derived from the Ami 8, and equipped with a Wankel engine and a hydropneumatic suspension. The bodies were produced by Heuliez from 1969 to 1971.

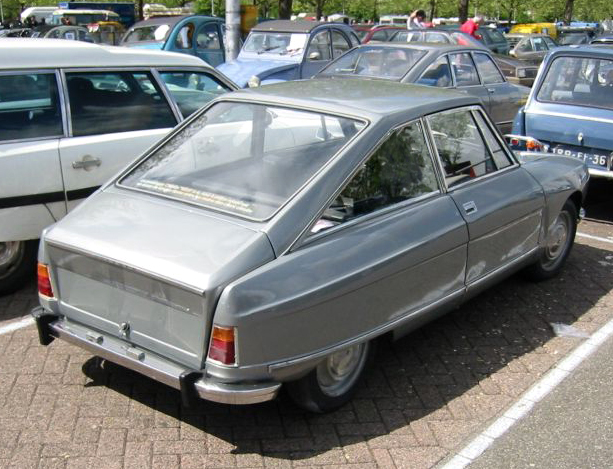
Citroën M35 rear

The longitudinally mounted rotary engine had a nominal capacity of 498 cc delivering 49 bhp (37 kW; 50 PS) and 50 lb⋅ft (68 N⋅m) of torque. According to factory figures the car had a performance roughly on a level with that of a Morris 1300. It could accelerate from 0 to 62 mph (100 km/h) in 19 seconds, 10 seconds faster than an Ami 8, and reach a top speed of about 90 mph (140 km/h). The M35 also used a larger 11-gallon (43-liter) fuel tank to improve range, as the fuel tank in the standard Ami 8 was deemed too small. The engine was so smooth running that Citroën fitted an audible alarm that went off as the car approached its redline of 7,000 rpm. The engine was supplied by a company formed in 1967 by NSU and Citroën called Comotor.

The M35 was an experimental vehicle and was not officially sold - rather it was supplied to loyal Citroën customers to get their comments on the usability of the design. Due to its experimental status, each car featured a banner at the bottom of the rear window which read in French “This Citroën M35 prototype fitted with a rotary piston engine is undergoing long term testing at the hands of a Citroën customer.”. Many aspects of the M35 made it to regular production. The rotary engine was deemed satisfactory and a dual rotor version of it was used in the GS Birotor in 1974; the gearbox used in the M35 was the GS 1015's gearbox (albeit with a normal shift pattern); certain suspension parts found their way into the GS line when it was introduced in 1970 and the seats that reclined just above the waist were found in none other than the SM.
