= Citroën Ami =

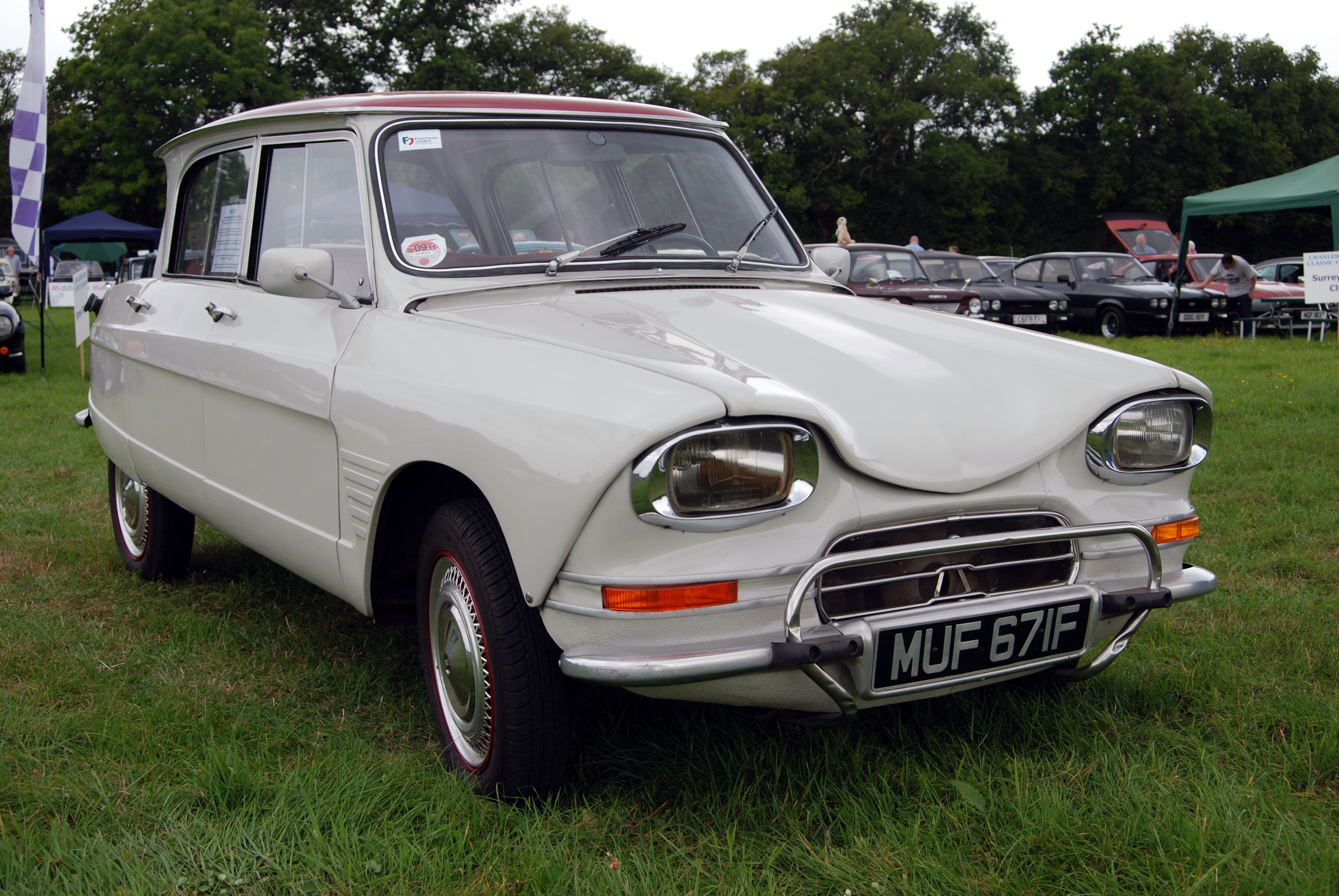
- Citroën Ami 6

Overview
- Manufacturer: Citroën
- Production: 1961–1978
- Assembly: France: Rennes (Chartres-de-Bretagne quarter); Argentina: Buenos Aires; Belgium: Forest, Brussels; Portugal: Mangualde (Mangualde Plant); Spain: Vigo (Vigo Plant); Yugoslavia: Koper, Slovenia (Cimos)
- Designer: Flaminio Bertoni

Body and chassis
- Class: Economy family car (B)
- Body style: 4-door notchback saloon (Ami 6); 4-door fastback saloon (Ami 8); 5-door estate 2-door van
- Layout: FF layout
- Related: Citroën 2CV; Citroën FAF; Citroën Dyane; Citroën M35; Citroën Méhari

Powertrain
- Engine: 602 cc flat-2 1015 cc flat-4

Dimensions
- Wheelbase: 94.5 in (2,400 mm)
- Length: Ami 6 – 3,920 mm (154 in); Ami 6 Break – 3,960 mm (156 in); Ami 8 Break – 3,990 mm (157 in)
- Width: 1,524 mm (60 in)
- Height: 57 in (1,448 mm)

Chronology
- Successor: Citroën Axel; Citroën Visa

The Citroën Ami is an economy car which was manufactured and marketed by Citroën from 1961 to 1978 over two generations, called the Ami 6 and the Ami 8. A family car, the Ami is front-wheel drive and was made in multiple body styles, including saloon car and estate car variants. The later Ami 8 fastback saloon featured a steeply raked rear window, in contrast to the earlier reverse-raked rear window of the Ami 6 notchback. Over 1,840,396 units were manufactured over the entire production run. The Ami and Citroën Dyane were replaced by the Citroën Visa and Citroën Axel.

== Name ==
Ami is the French word for "friend". With its 602 cc engine capacity fractionally above the limit for 2 CV designation, the Ami was nicknamed the 3CV, differentiating it from the long established Citroën 2CV.

3CV stands for Trois chevaux, or "three horses" — CV originally being the initials for "chevaux-vapeur" (horsepower – literally 'steam horses'), but used here for "chevaux fiscaux". The "cheval fiscal" was a French fiscal unit based on engine size with the smaller CV designating economy cars.

== Overview ==
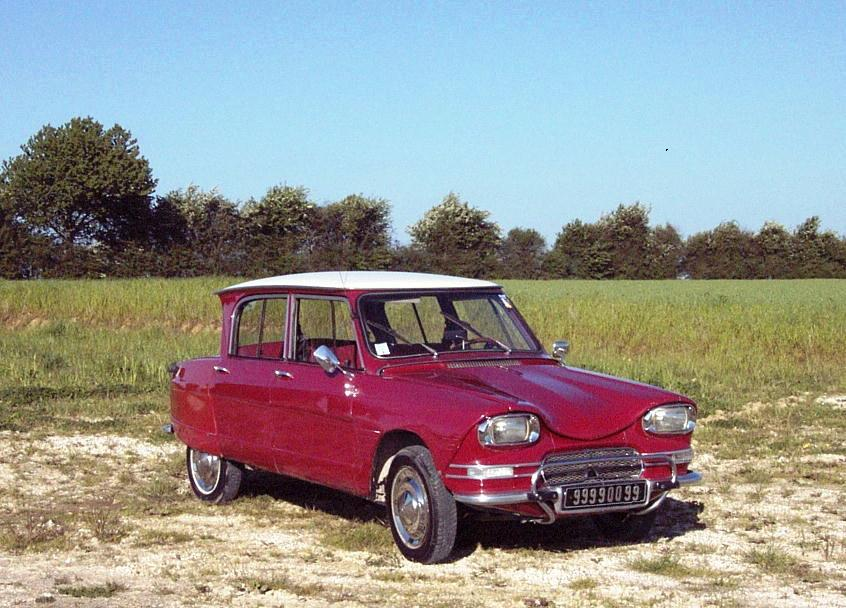
1968 Citroën Ami 6 (Rouge Corsaire)

The Citroën Ami had its formal French launch on 25 April 1961, four months ahead of the August introduction of the widely anticipated Renault 4. Both the Renault 4 and the Citroën Ami responded to a perceived market need for a vehicle slightly larger and less rustic than the 2CV. The Ami is a rebodied 2CV with certain mechanical upgrades (particularly a larger engine than the 1950s 2CV) to compensate for the added weight. At launch all the cars were powered by an air cooled 602 cc two-cylinder flat engine which would also be offered at extra cost in the 2CV from 1970.

The platform chassis and suspension is similar to the 2CV, being independent all round using leading and trailing arms and coil springs interconnected front to rear. For a detailed suspension description see Citroën 2CV.

The Ami's seats were easily removable. Sales pitches of the Ami included photographs of the seats being used as picnic chairs.

== Technical innovation ==
The Ami and the Ford Taunus P3 were the first cars with rectangular or lozenge-shaped (non-round) headlights. This technical innovation was developed by lighting manufacturers Hella (Taunus) and Cibie (Ami). Soon this innovation found its way to the exclusive coach built Maserati 5000 GT.

== Initial sales ==
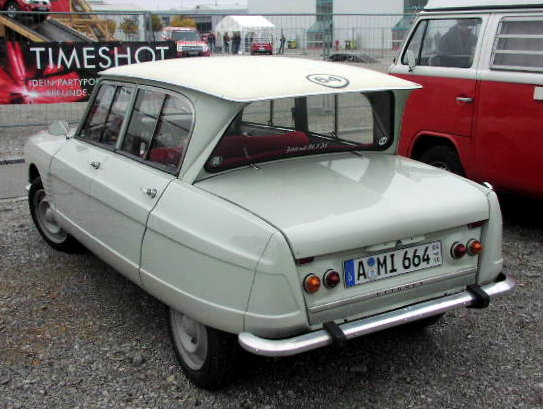
Citroën Ami 6 Berline rear detail

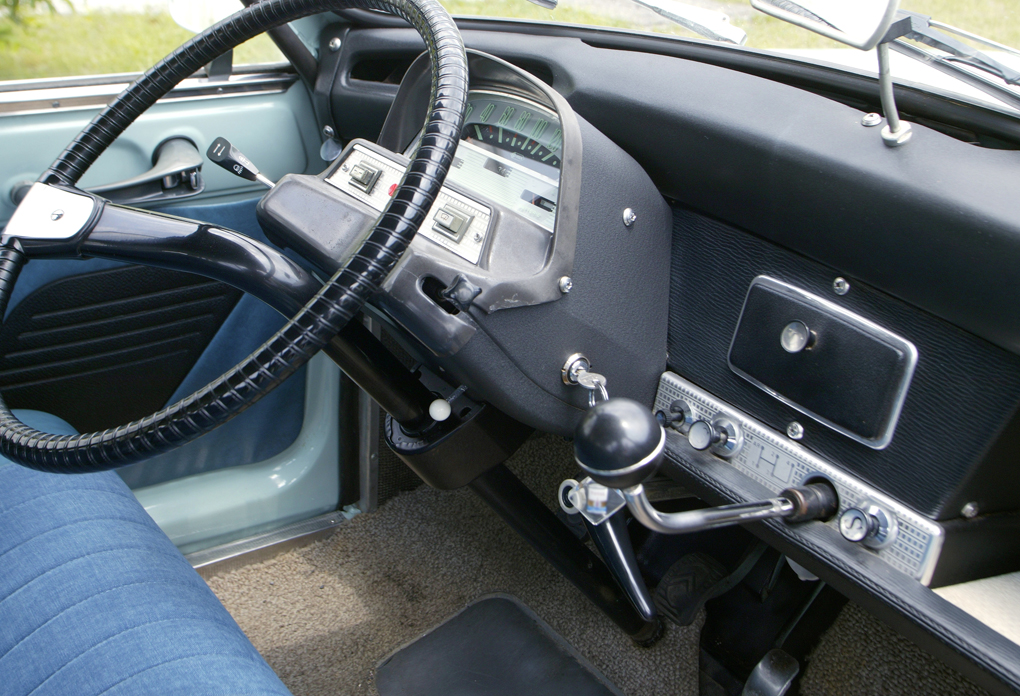
Dashboard and shift lever of Ami 6

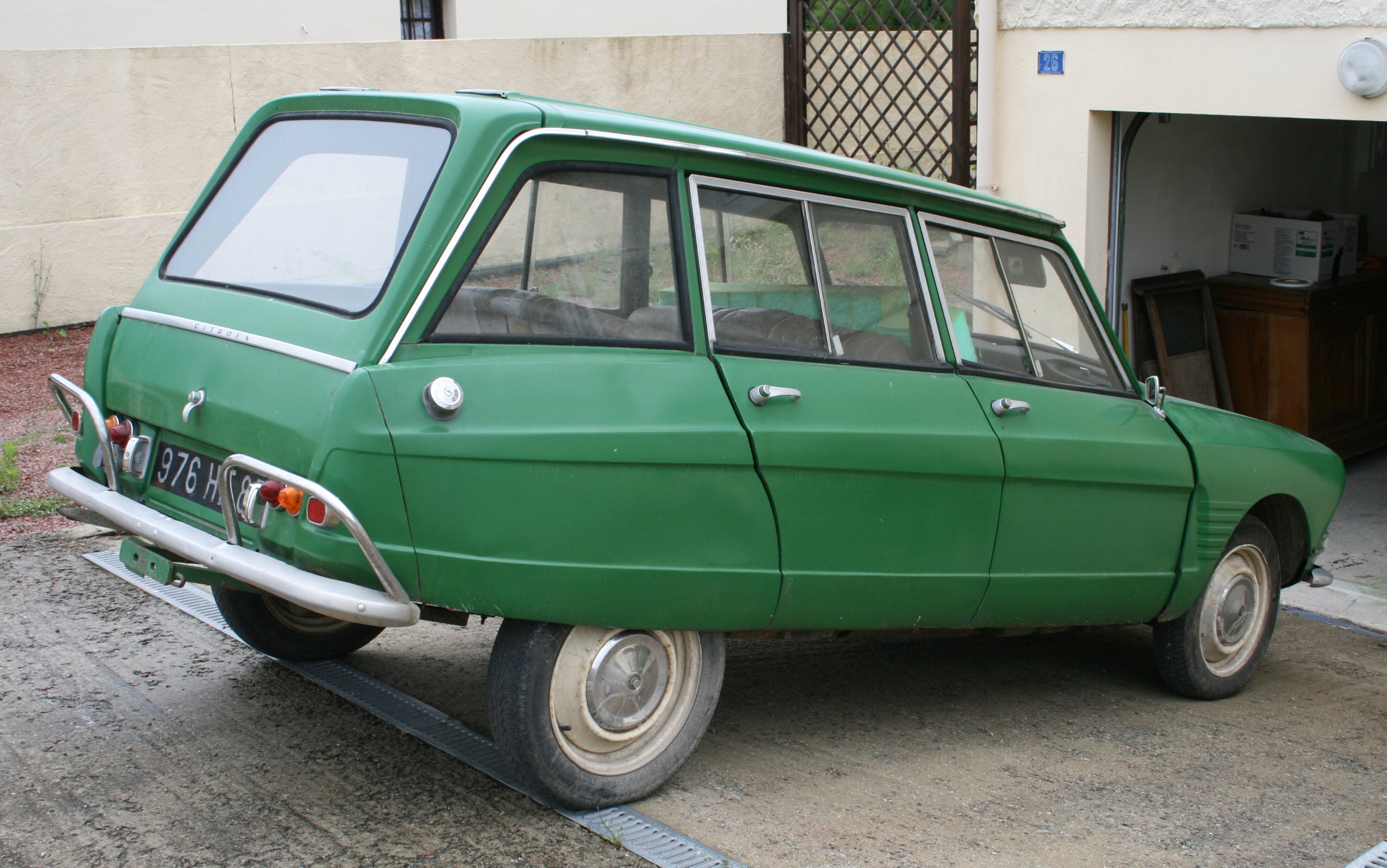
Citroën Ami 6 Break (estate) model

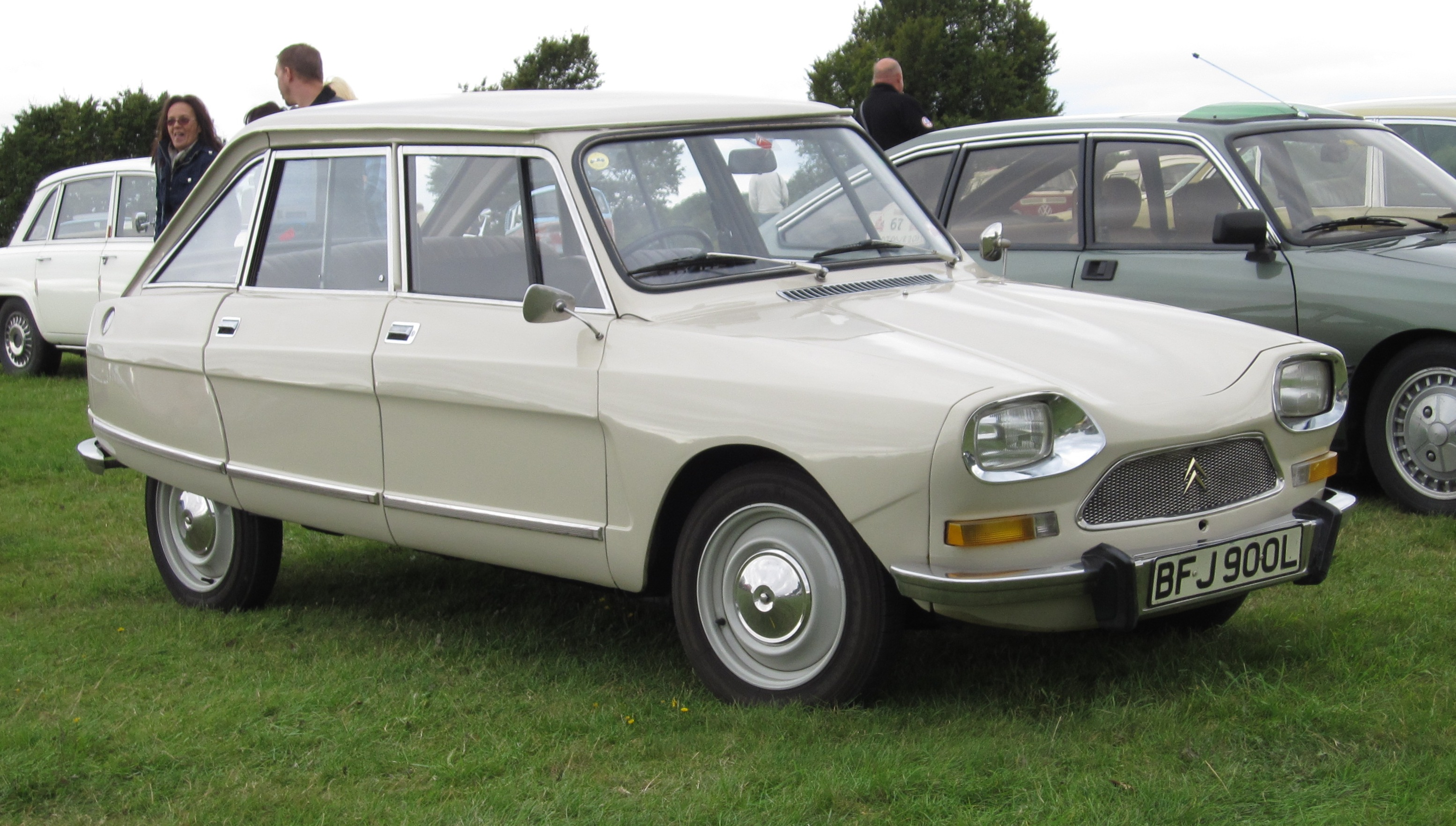
Citroën Ami 8 front view

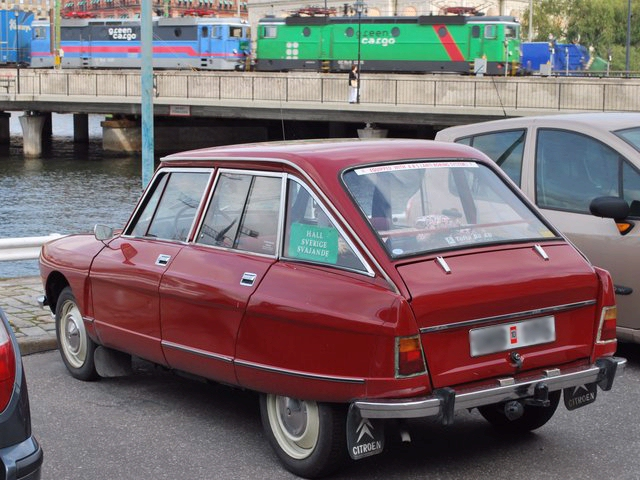
The Ami 8 featured a more conventionally positioned back window than the Ami 6 – like a fastback

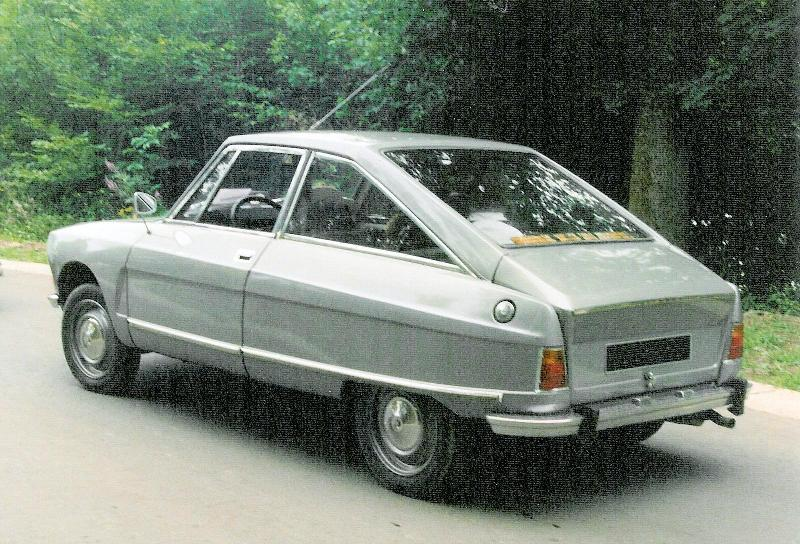
The experimental Citroën M35 was based on the Ami 8 but used a 995 cc single rotor Wankel engine

The car went on sale in France in April 1961, though Citroën implemented some simple upgrades in time for the Paris Motor Show only six months later. The most visible change involved the replacement of the fixed windows on the rear doors with two-part horizontal sliding windows, similar to those already fitted on the front doors. Sales initially were not as good as those of the older 2CV; the Ami's first full year of production was 1962, during which only 85,358 of the cars were sold, while the thirteen-year-old 2CV managed 144,759 sales during the same period. Although the Ami had a modern body, it shared the aggressively minimalist underpinnings of the older car, and this made it hard to justify a starting price for the Ami which, at the end of 1961, was 35% higher.

== Versions ==
The 1961 Ami 6 sedan is distinguished by an unusual reverse-raked notchback rear window, similar in style to the 1959 Ford Anglia 105E in Great Britain. A similar design feature was used on the first generation three-door Citroën C4. This design feature first appeared on the US 1953 Packard Balboa-X show car. It was first put into production on the 1957 Mercury Turnpike Cruiser and 1958-1960 Lincoln Continentals. In the American cars the rear window could be opened as an aid to ventilation before air conditioning became standardised, and in the American fashion was given a name, the "Breezeway Window".

The later Ami 8 saloon has a fastback rear window. It was redesigned by the French car design and bodywork company, Heuliez. Most notable changes were the front part and bonnet and the sloping, rather than inverted, rear window on the saloon. The estate version of the Ami 8, the 'Break' had a similar general appearance to that of the Ami 6 although the later car's taillights were integrated into the rear wings.

The Ami Super, sometimes also called Ami 10, was a flat-4 variant powered by the engine of the GS and produced between 1973 and 1976.

The Ami Super was offered in the same three trim levels as the Ami 8, Luxe, Confort and Club on Saloon and Luxe and Confort on the 'Break' versions. These trim differences were fairly minor with Luxe models having bench front and rear seats and vinyl floor matting. Confort trim offered reclining front seats in place of the front bench. The Club models can be considered the Pallas of the Ami range featured sound proofing pads on the floor and bulkhead, carpet including boot lining, stainless steel trim on the window frames and side rubbing strips on the doors and rear wings. Club trim was only available up to the end of the 1973 model year, after that point Ami 8 and Ami super were only available in Luxe and Confort specification.

From 1974 Ami super models were revamped to feature a double line graphic along the exterior of the body sides, either in black or silver depending on body colour, with slotted wheels and double line detailing on the hubcaps. The rear window also featured a graphic in white proclaiming "Ami Super 1015cm³"

As the Ami Super looked very much like an Ami 8, and could surprise many by demonstrating its dramatic performance advantage compared to the Ami 8 (55 hp compared to 32 hp). Quoted by Autocar magazine in the UK as a "Q car par excellence" sadly in France its 5CV tax rating made little sense in a small car and as a result sales were low compared to the Ami 8. In the UK however where no such tax penalties existed the Ami Super attracted healthy sales although is now a rare sight due to poor corrosion resistance, a feature suffered by many vehicles of this era.

The Ami Super production reached close to 42,000 in sedan and station wagon by February 1976. Production of the Ami 8 continued until early 1979 and reached in the region of 722,000 cars produced.

A small series of prototype coupés, the M35 were produced as test vehicles for loyal customers — testing the single-rotor Comotor Wankel engine, as also seen in the NSU Spider. A twin-rotor version of this engine reached production form with the NSU Ro 80 and GS Birotor.

== Production ==
The Ami 6 was the first model manufactured at the new Citroën plant in Rennes opened in 1961, where later the Dyane and GS were manufactured.

- Spain

The Ami 6 and Ami 8 were also built by Citroën Hispania in Vigo (Spain) from 1967 to 1978, but they were never called "Ami" because of a legal problem with that name. The equivalences with French-built models are:

- Ami 6 berline: never built in Spain.
- Ami 6 break old model (M4 type engine): Citroën Estate 3cv.
- Ami 6 break new model (M28 type engine): Citroën Dynam.
- Ami 8 berline: Citroën 8 or C-8.
- Ami 8 break: Citroën 8 Familiar (or just Citroën Familiar).
- Yugoslavia

Beside Spain, in Europe Ami was also built in Yugoslavia, in Slovenian factory Cimos where many other Citroën models were produced for the Yugoslav market.

- Argentina

Out of Europe, the Ami 8 was made until 1978 in Buenos Aires, Argentina. It was only built in the estate version in either "Club" or "Elysee" trims. It was exported to Uruguay, Paraguay, and in CKD kits to Arica, Chile from 1976. Chilean assembly was shut down in favour of the Citroën CX in early 1978.

== Performance ==
An Ami 6 tested by the British magazine The Motor in 1962 had a top speed of 65.3 mph (105.1 km/h) and could accelerate from 0-50 mph (80 km/h) in 30.3 seconds. A fuel consumption of 53 mpg_{‑imp} (5.3 L/100 km; 44 mpg_{‑US}) was recorded. The test car cost £823 including taxes on the UK market.

Version	Engine	Power	Max speed
Ami 6 (1961–1963)	602 cc flat-2 air-cooled	22 hp (16 kW) at 4,500 rpm	65 mph (105 km/h)
Ami 6 (1964–1968)	602 cc flat-2 air-cooled	26 hp (19 kW) at 4,750 rpm	68 mph (109 km/h)
Ami 6 (1968)	602 cc flat-2 air-cooled	28 hp (21 kW) at 5,400 rpm	70 mph (110 km/h)
Ami 6 (1969)	602 cc flat-2 air-cooled	32 hp (24 kW) at 5,750 rpm	76 mph (122 km/h)
Ami 8	602 cc flat-2 air-cooled	32 hp (24 kW) at 5,750 rpm	76 mph (122 km/h)
Ami Super	1015 cc flat-4 air-cooled	55 hp (41 kW) at 5,750 rpm	87 mph (140 km/h)
M35	Single rotor Wankel engine	49 hp (37 kW) at 5,500 rpm	89 mph (143 km/h)

== Model changes in detail ==
The following table summarises information to distinguish Ami Models.

Years	image	type	Model Changes
1961		AM	Launch in April.
1962		AM	Sliding rear windows (one half only).
1963		AM	Version for export to the United States: double round headlights, front turn signals round, additional chrome bumpers, grille and stainless steel license plate closer. Engine 26 hp instead of 22 hp. Hydraulic dampers. Suspended Brake and clutch pedals.
Nov 1964		AMB AMF AMC	Estate body type. New rear light units.
Oct 1967		AMBPA	Estate Club model. Twin round headlights. Improved finish.
May 1968		AM2 AMB2	M28 engine of 32 hp at 5,750 rpm. Double sliding front windows. Trapezoidal taillamps.
March 1969		AM3	The Ami 8 replaces the Ami 6.
July 1969		AMJA AMJB	The Ami 8 receives disc brakes on the front. The hydraulic system works with LHM fluid.
Sept 1969		AMB3 AMC3	Ami 8 estate launched.
Jan 1973		AMJF AMJG AMJH	Launch of the Ami Super.

== Production figures and history ==
Total production of the Ami models (except M35) reached 1,840,121 units according to the manufacturer's data. It is divided between the models as follows:

Model	Ami 6 Berline/Saloon	Ami 6 Estate	Ami 6 Service Van	Ami 8 Berline/Saloon	Ami 8 Estate	Ami 8 Service Van	Ami Super Berline/Saloon	Ami Super Estate	Ami Super Service Van
Reference Code.	AM AM2	AMB AM2B	AMC(2) AMF(2)	AM3	AMB3 AMJB	AMC3 AMJC	AMJF	AMJG	AMJH
Production	483 986	551 880	3 518	342 743	386 582	26 630	24 797	19 222	801

Model	1961	1962	1963	1964	1965	1966	1967	1968	1969	1970	1971	1972	1973	1974- 78	Total
Ami 6 Ami 8 Ami Super	19,010	85,358	106,224	121,819	158,067	180,085	169,390	145,102	163,182	124,962	105,018	96,716	107,339	258,124	1,840,396
