= Citroën FAF =

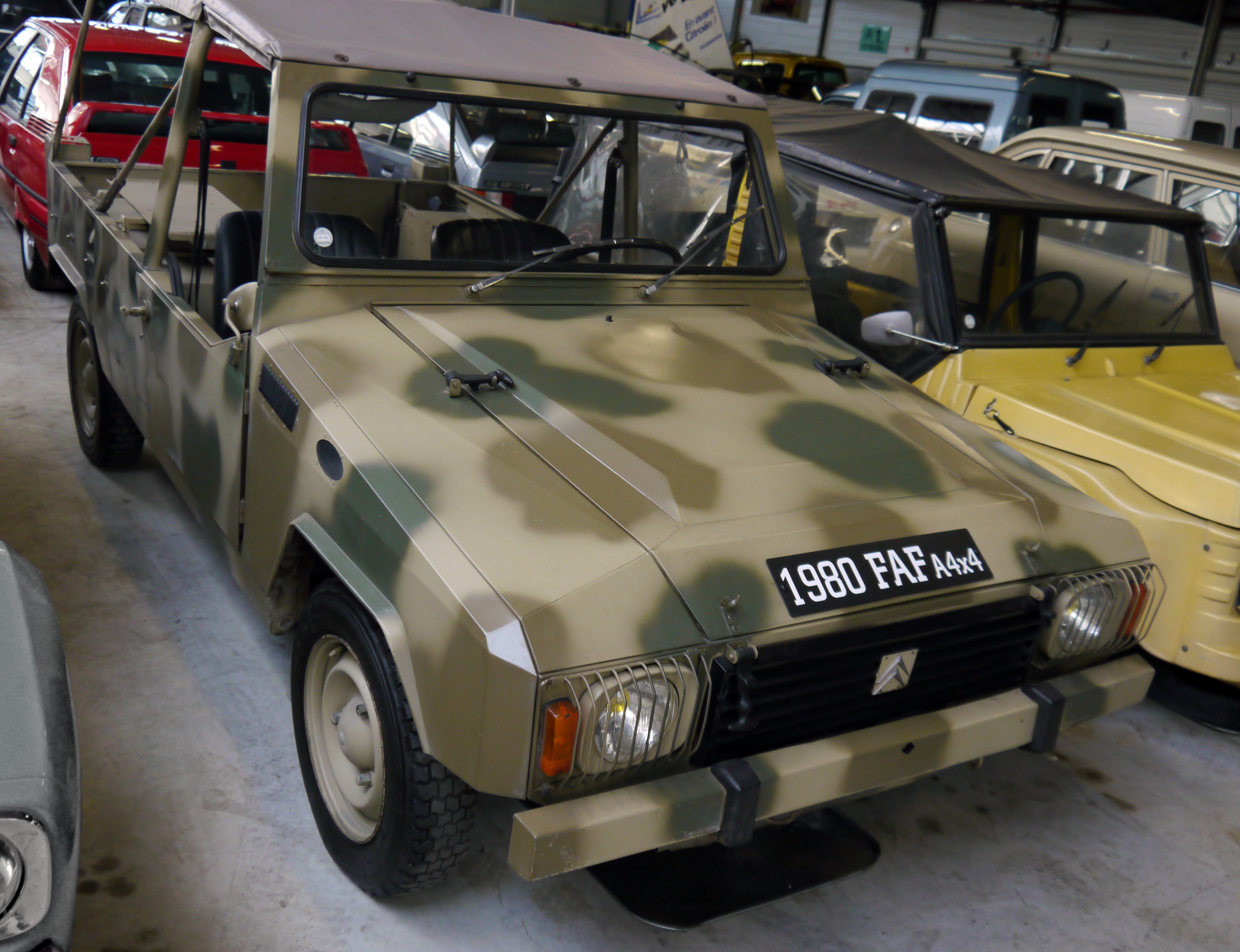

Overview
- Manufacturer: Citroën
- Production: 1973–1981
- Assembly: Portugal: Mangualde (Mangualde Plant); Central African Republic: Bangui; Guinea Bissau: Bissau; Indonesia: Jakarta (Gaya Motor); Senegal: Dakar

Body and chassis
- Class: Compact SUV
- Body style: 2-door/no-door utility
- Layout: FF layout
- Related: Baby-Brousse; Citroën 2CV; Citroën Méhari; Citroën Dyane; Citroën Ami; Citroën Bijou

Powertrain
- Engine: Flat-2

Chronology
- Successor: Citroën C-Crosser; Citroën E-Méhari; Namco Pony Super (For Namco Pony)

The Citroën FAF is a small utility vehicle produced by the French manufacturer Citroën from 1973 until 1981. It was built using a combination of imported and locally sourced components in various developing countries. The body was made of easy to produce, folded steel panels, giving it an appearance resembling a metal-bodied version of the Méhari. The flat metal panels and simple components were meant to allow for easier production, mostly in developing countries.

== Origin ==
The origin of this idea was the privately built 1963 Baby-Brousse from Ivory Coast, and its many derivatives. Notably these include La Dalat (Vietnam), Pony (Greece), Jyane-Mehari (Iran), and Yagan (Chile).

The various Baby-Brousse cars were quite successful, selling over 30,000 units.

Both the FAF and Baby-Brousse are derived from the 2CV. The concept predates the FAF name, so it is often erroneously reported that some of Baby-Brousse vehicles were based on the FAF.

== Name and target market ==
FAF stood for the French Facile à Fabriquer and Facile à Financer (Easy to Manufacture, Easy to Finance).

The primary target market for the FAF was Africa. However, the concept of a "second-class" car that was connected with the FAF seems to have affected its manufacture and sales remained low.

== Pre-FAF cars ==
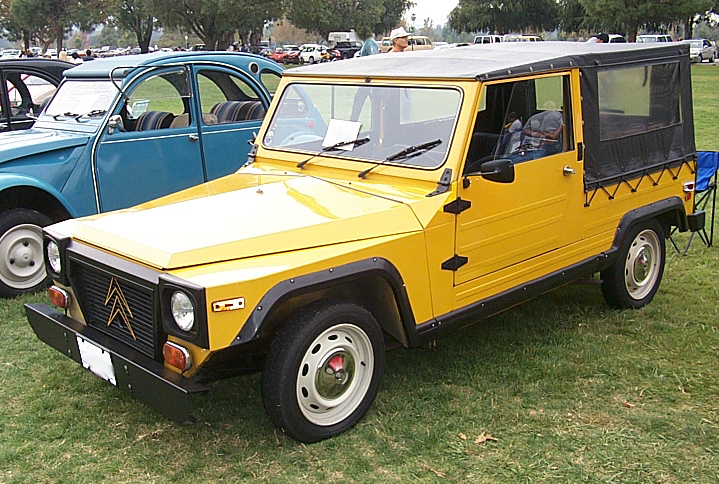
Namco Pony Greece U.S. Model

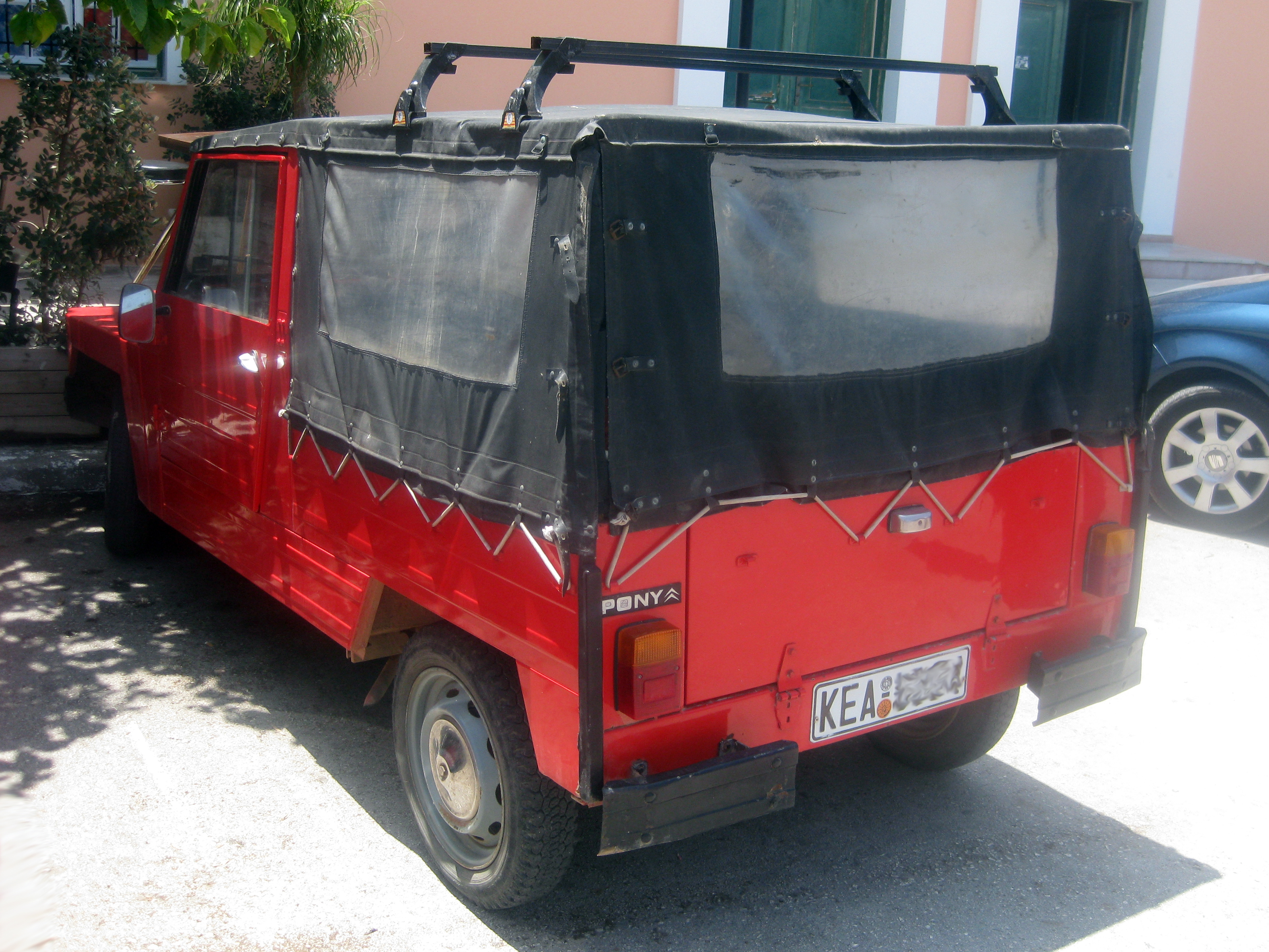
Pony rear

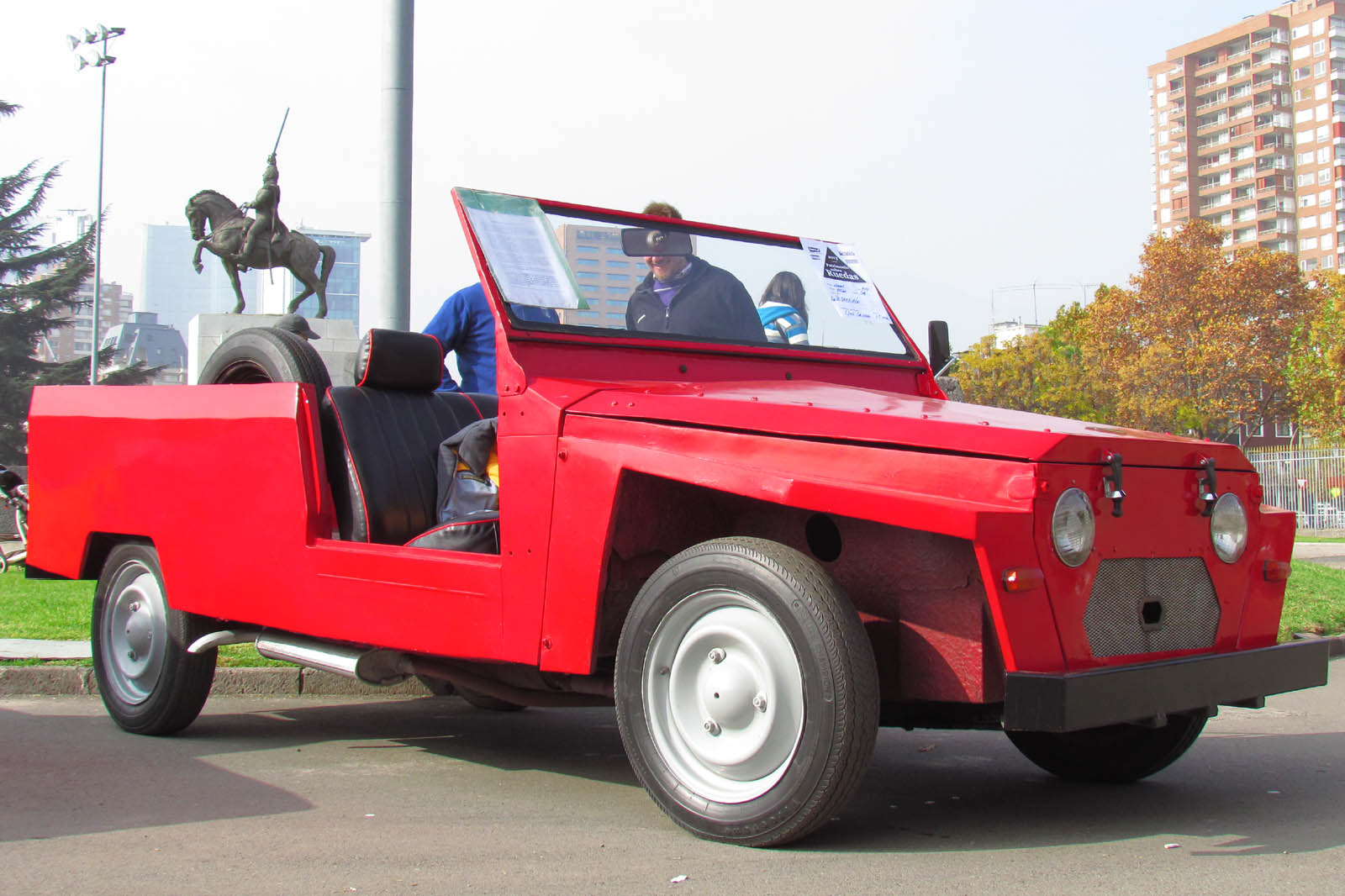
Citroën Yagan from Chile

The FAF idea coincided with the widespread production of Baby Brousse 2CV-based vehicles in many countries, so the two often overlap.

In 1969, Citroën's Vietnamese subsidiary began building La Dalat, the first automobile manufactured in Vietnam. Production ended when Americans departed Saigon in 1975 at the end of the Vietnam War. In total, 3880 Dalats were built.

In 1975 (after original introduction in 1972), the Greek firm Namco began production of the Pony. This was the most successful version of these 'simplified' 2CV utility vehicles, selling 30,000 units. The Pony was exported as well, including to the United States of America. Production of this "poor man's jeep," that benefitted from special tax rules, ended in 1983, two years after Greece joined the European Union. 67% of the parts were of Greek origin.

An attempt to start production in Sri Lanka by the Ceylon Transport Board in the early 1970s failed due to a dispute over royalties, but a prototype was displayed at the Republic Day celebrations in 1974.

Various kit car style bodies inspired by the FAF and Méhari, such as Belgium's VanClee, were also developed.

The car was produced and sold in Iran under the name "Mehari," though it was not a plastic-bodied car like the other Mehari. About 9,000 were produced in the 1970s. They came in at least red, green and blue but by the late 1970s most on the street were light blue.

== Production history ==
Country	1977	1978	1979	1980	1981	Total
Portugal	180	30	180	240	180	810
Guinea Bissau	0	0	120	180	0	300
Central African Republic	0	0	0	60	0	60
Sénégal	0	0	0	0	15	15
Sri Lanka	1	0	0	0	0	1
Indonesia	0	0	60	540	0	600
Total FAF	181	30	360	1,020	195	1,786
