= Comotor =

Joint venture company for the purpose of producing Wankel engines

Wankel motor

Comotor SA was a joint venture between NSU and Citroën, created in Luxembourg in April 1967. Its goal was to produce Wankel engines.

It followed an earlier, 1964 joint venture of both companies, the Geneva-based Comobil subsidiary, focusing on the development of the engines. Comotor engines were used by the Citroën M35 and by the GS Birotor.

In 1969 the company purchased a large 850 000 m^{2} plot of land at Altforweiler, half an hour to the east of Luxembourg in German Saarland in order to build a factory.

The venture was hamstrung by technical, reliability, and fuel consumption issues. Although Citroën took a slow and calculated development path, including a two-year beta test program in which 267 Citroën M35 prototypes were tested exhaustively by selected customers, rising fuel prices in 1973 nullified market demand for the fuel-thirsty engine. The vast sums that were invested in the Comobil and Comotor joint ventures were major contributors to the bankruptcy of both NSU and Citroën.

Henk van Veen of the Netherlands designed the OCR 1000 motorcycle around the Comotor engine. His company manufactured 38 of these motorcycles between 1974 and 1978.
