= Stellantis Rennes Plant =

French car manufacturing and assembly plant

- Built: 1961
- Location: Stellantis, Site de Rennes, Route de Nantes, 35177 Chartres-de-Bretagne, France; Rennes, France
- Coordinates: 48.05833333°N 1.71361111°W
- Industry: Automotive
- Area: 240 ha (590 acres)

Location of the Stellantis Rennes plant in Brittany

The Stellantis Rennes Plant is one of the principal car plants in France, producing approximately 340,000 cars in 2005. The Rennes plant was acquired by the PSA Group in 1976 when Peugeot took a majority stake in the Citroën company which had built the plant.

Stellantis Rennes is the largest private employer in the Rennes conurbation, with approximately 2,000 people as of 2021.

In January 2021, PSA and Fiat Chrysler Automobiles merged to form Stellantis.

== Location and site ==
The plant is located to the south-west of Rennes in the commune of Chartres-de-Bretagne, just beyond the Rennes city limits on a large site at Rennes-la-Janais, across the road from the city's airport.

The completion in 2010 of a €50 million investment in new model production facilities will leave the total covered factory area at 500,000 m^{2}. By 2008 the area under cover had grown to more than 700,000 m^{2}, but this was to be reduced in order "to reduce fixed costs and optimize logistical efficiencies". In practice, the site is a large one: where it was cheaper to build a new dedicated assembly hall than to refit an existing one it is likely that some of the older buildings included in the quoted 2008 figure will have been already unused for many years.

Before 1999 the company also owned a plant for the manufacture of rubber components on the city's western (Route de Lorient) Industrial Zone and statistics from that period concerning matters such as employment often aggregate the figures for the two plants together.

== History ==
At the beginning of the 20th century, with France producing more automobiles than any other country, automobile construction was heavily dependent on a handful of traditional craft based skills, and the country's auto-industry, along with most heavy industry in France, was heavily concentrated in the Paris region. Having grown prosperous as a munitions producer during the war, when automobile pioneer André Citroën was ready to start his own manufacturing business, applying revolutionary production techniques which he had seen in development at Ford's Detroit plant, the obvious place to base a new auto-business in France was Paris, which is where Citroën's car factory was established in 1919.

Forty years later, the production techniques pioneered by Citroën had permitted the auto-industry to become one of the most important sectors in the industrialising economy, and auto-production had become massively labour-intensive. The artisanal skills of the Paris carriage maker were no longer of much relevance, however. Commercial success for the 2CV and (more recently) DS models left Citroën desperately short of production capacity in their cramped Paris site, and the decision was taken to build a new greenfield plant. The Rennes location was chosen in 1958 on account of its abundant supply of available labour and the low wages in an area where the economy was heavily dependent on the primary sector. Farming in the 1950s was beginning to shed labour fast as an increasing share of the agricultural workload hitherto reliant on manual labour was mechanised. Citroën's decision to build their new plant on a Greenfield site in an area still dominated by agriculture mirrored auto-industry developments taking place at this time in Michigan and several adjacent states in the USA.

The Rennes-la-Janais plant was opened in 1961 in a ceremony adorned by the dominating presence of the president. Citroën products featured prominently in the presidential cortege, but the first cars produced at the Rennes plant were small Ami 6 models rather than the DS favoured for presidential use. The Ami continued in production for ten years, till 1971, having in 1967 been joined on the production line by the Dyane and in 1970 by the GS which launched Citroën into the middle market sector. It was the medium-sized cars which would henceforth dominate the production lines at Rennes while almost all of the old 2 CVs continued to be produced at the company's Paris plant until the late 1980s after which that model's final years' production were increasingly concentrated on a small plant in Portugal.

In the 1980s, with Citroën's finances subjected by its new owners to a more rigorous cost control régime, financial stability returned. Investment was applied judiciously, however, and employment at the plant peaked at around 14,000 in the 1980s. This was also a period during which the company's Vigo plant in north-west Spain was beginning to move away from exclusive concentration on small cars, reflecting rapidly rising incomes in Spain. This meant that during the 1990s the two plants would find themselves in increasingly direct competition to build the same cars, with the costs of France's generous social benefits, funded by employment taxes, leaving the Rennes plant looking in some respects expensive. One response, as in much of France's manufacturing industry, was increased dependence on new industrial robots for many routine assembly-line tasks. By the first decade of 21st century nevertheless Vigo was producing more cars than Rennes, and the Rennes plant's labour force had more than halved, to approximately 6,900 in 2009.

In 2004, after 42 years, the plant produced its ten millionth car. 2004 was also the year when, for the first time, the company produced a Peugeot badged vehicle, the 407 at the Rennes plant, joined in 2009 by the slow selling (and soon to be discontinued) 607. The Peugeot 407 sold very strongly for several years, although demand tailed off quite sharply in 2008 and 2009: both the sales success of this important model, and its more recent decline, have been closely reflected in the level of activity at the plant in recent years.

In 2009 production of the Xsara Picasso, hitherto shared between Spain and France, transferred fully to Vigo. In 2010 the plant's output is concentrated on the company's Platform 3 models, being currently the Peugeot 407 and the Citroën C5, along with the larger C6. Preparations are well underway to assemble the forthcoming Peugeot 508 at Rennes, with production commencing on a highly automated production line - eventually at the rate of up to 45 vehicles per hour - after the 2010 summer break. Other reports apparently based on company press releases have suggested a rate of 55 cars per hours for the extensively upgraded new production line.

The decision taken at the start of the twenty-first century to focus on C-class cars, at the larger end of the passenger car market, has not served the plant well. The sector has been under attack from luxury automakers such as Audi and BMW while more cost conscious buyers have been switching to smaller family cars in the Golf / Peugeot 308 class. With annual volumes well below 200,000 cars in recent years the manufacturer has been able to lower the factory's break-even volume, however.

The site is a large one, and since February 2014 it has accommodated a substantial workshop for the renovation of High-speed trains, staffed by employees on assignment the SNCF from the PSA workforce.

== Site layout ==
The site can be divided into four zones, covering respectively administration, logistics (with general support), quality and production. Of these four elements it is, of course, production that uses most of the space, and the production activities are in turn divided between four sections as follows:

• Stamping: The principal metal components of the body and chassis are stamped into shape using heavy hydraulic presses.
• Body shop: The panels are welded together using robotic welding machines, and emerge as recognisable car bodies.
• Paint shop: The painting process, which is also highly automated, involves immersion of each car body in a succession of basins with the final coats being robotically spray painted.
• Final assembly: Engines and other sub-assemblies from other PSA plants are fitted to the painted bodies along with smaller more specialist component many of them sourced from third party suppliers. It is the coordination of all these elements that forms a major portion of the company's logistics activity.

The various parts of the production area are linked by an array of automated conveyors. At the end of the final assembly area the cars are welcomed first to the testing section and then to the dispatch area.

== More statistics ==
- The site covers 240 hectares.
- The site contains 80 buildings.
- More than 300,000 vehicles are produced at the plant annually. The plant is claimed to have an annual capacity of 400,000 though annual output has never exceeded 350,000.

Models principally produced up to the end of 2005 (figures rounded):

- BX (2,000,000)
- GS (1,980,000)
- Ami 6 (1,500,000)
- Xantia (1,000,000)
- Xsara (921,000)
- C5 (750,000)
- AX (600,000)
- Visa (561,000)
- Peugeot 407 (500,000)
- Dyane (373,000)
- XM (302,000)
- ZX (135,000)
- Méhari (10,000)
- 2CV (10,000)

== Production ==
- Peugeot 5008 (2017-2024)
- Citroën C5 Aircross I (2017-2025)
- Citroën C5 Aircross II (2025-present)

== The Barre Thomas Plant ==
Prior to 1999 the PSA group owned a second plant at Rennes dedicated to the production of rubber based components for the automobile industry. This plant, known as the "Barre Thomas" (plant), is located in an industrial zone (ZI Ouest/Route de Lorient) to the west of Rennes. The plant was sold to an Italian company in 1999, since when its ownership structure has charted a far from simple course: currently "Barre Thomas" is owned by an investment fund called Silver Point. The plant, which dates originally from 1954, still employs more than 1,600 people (2005) and still sends more than 90% of its output to the PSA Rennes-la-Janais plant.
