= Citroën Dyane =

Economy family car (1967–1983)

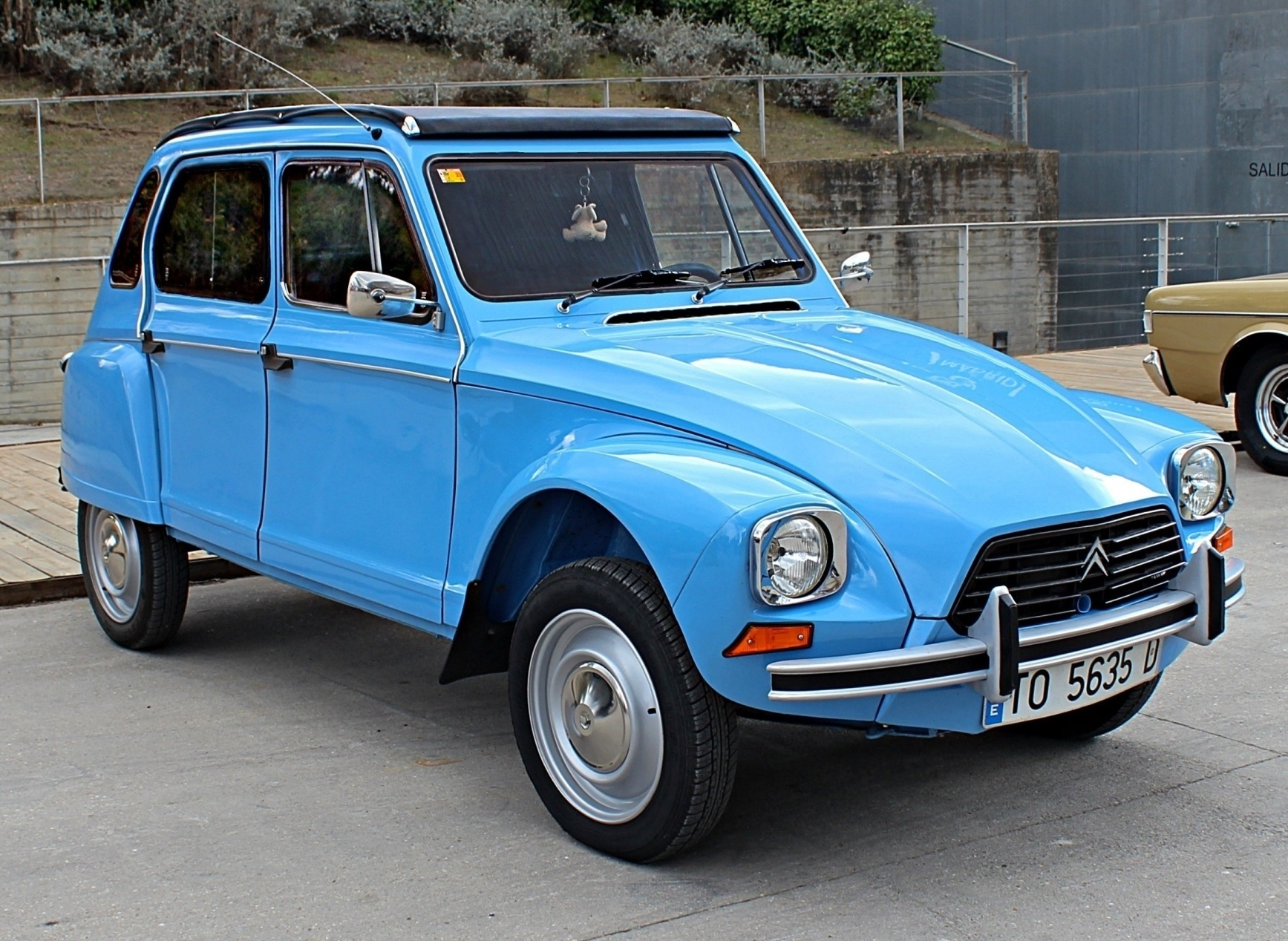

Overview
- Manufacturer: Citroën
- Production: 1967–1983; 1,443,583 units
- Assembly: France: Rennes (Rennes Plant); Iran: Tehran (SAIPA); Portugal: Mangualde (Mangualde Plant); Spain: Vigo (Vigo Plant); Yugoslavia: Koper, Slovenia (Cimos)
- Designer: Robert Opron, Louis Bionier

Body and chassis
- Class: Supermini (B)
- Body style: 5-door hatchback
- Layout: FF layout
- Related: Citroën 2CV; Citroën Acadiane; Citroën Ami; Citroën Méhari; Citroën FAF; Citroën Bijou

Powertrain
- Engine: 425 cc H2; 435 cc H2; 602 cc H2

Dimensions
- Wheelbase: 94.5 in (2,400 mm)
- Length: 153.5 in (3,899 mm)
- Width: 59 in (1,499 mm)
- Curb weight: 1,310 lb (594 kg) (approx)

Chronology
- Predecessor: Citroën 2CV
- Successor: Citroën Visa; Citroën Axel

The Citroën Dyane is an economy family car produced by the French automaker Citroën from 1967 to 1983. The Dyane's design remained almost completely based on the Citroën 2CV and its underpinnings, but at the same time received almost all-new body panels, distinguished by more straight, angular overall features. The rear introduced a prominent large hatchback, while the modernized front wings now integrated the headlights.

A panel van version named the Acadiane was also derived from the Dyane. Nearly 1.45 million Dyanes and some 250,000 Acadianes were made, for a total of ~1.7 million units. Although the Dyane was a complete reskin of the 2CV, and body panels are not interchangeable, the 2CV remained on sale as a cheaper, entry-level model, and when the Dyane was retired after more than fifteen years, its predecessor, the 2CV, kept soldiering on, outliving its intended successor.

== Market context ==
The Dyane was a development of the Citroën 2CV, and was intended as an answer to the increasingly popular Renault 4, which after its introduction in 1961 had affected 2CV sales. Like the Renault 4, the Dyane was designed from the outset as a hatchback with some other styling differences, such as conventional round headlamps set into the front fender with a squared stainless steel trim ring – as opposed to the old-fashioned separate units found on the 2CV – and stainless steel wheel embellishments as standard. It was and is often asserted that the Dyane was intended to replace the 2CV, but it was nevertheless aimed slightly higher in the Citroën range – between the 2CV and the Ami – and attracted a different clientele seeking the versatility offered by the Dyane's hatchback.

== Panhard connections ==
At the time of the Dyane's development, the Citroën design department was busy on updates of the key DS and Ami models: design of the Dyane was therefore initially subcontracted to the Panhard design department, Panhard's non-military business having in 1965 been absorbed into Citroën's car business. The Panhard team under Louis Bionier (who had designed every Panhard model introduced between the late 1920s and the mid 1960s) produced a proposal that at a detailed level proved controversial with Citroën's design chief, Robert Opron: the car was significantly reworked ahead of launch. The Dyane's Panhard associations are also reflected in its name, Panhard having registered a copyright on the name Dyane along with Dyna, Dynavia and Dynamic.

== Description ==
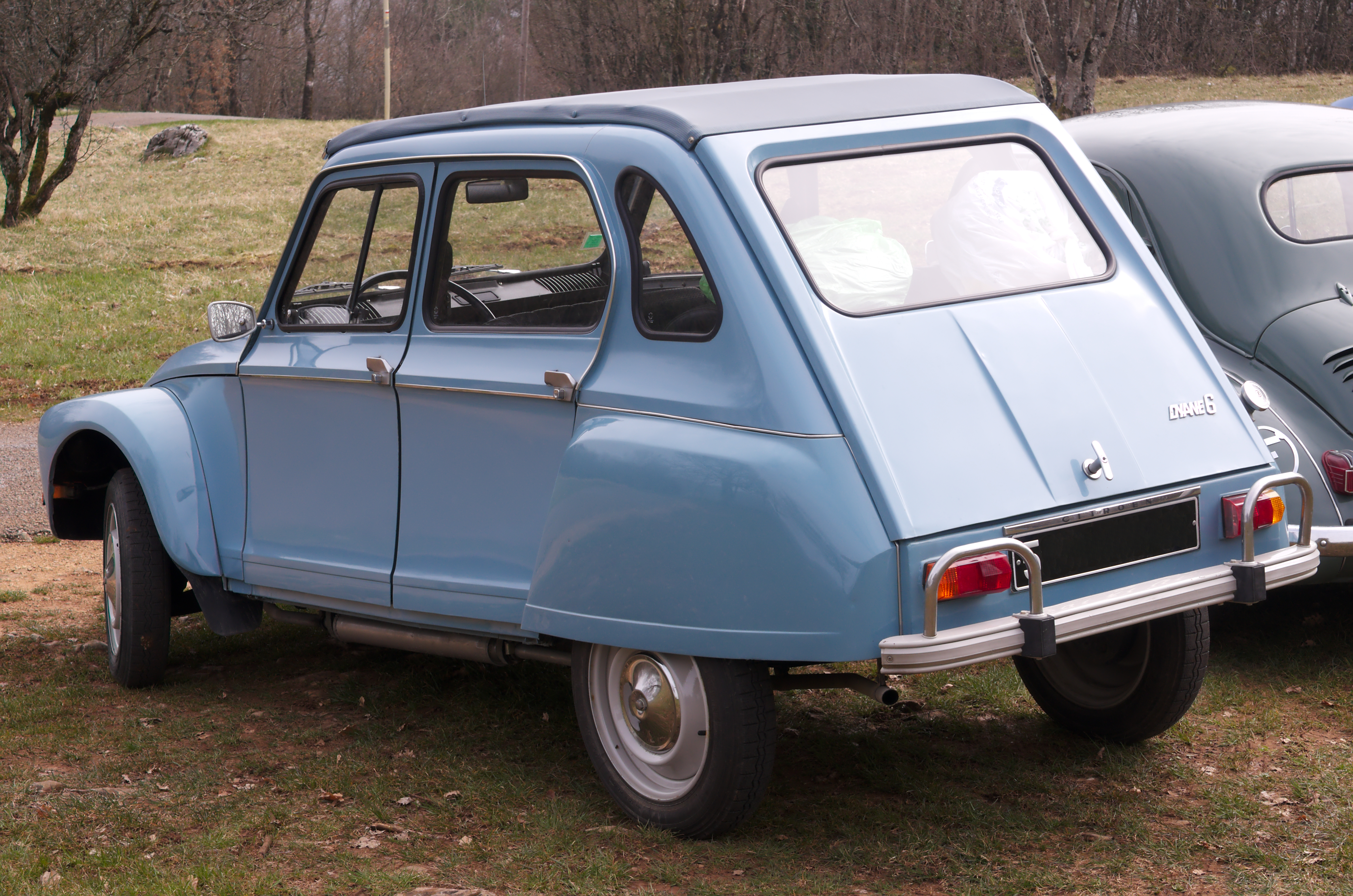
Dyane rear with large, flat hatch

=== Equipment levels ===
At launch the car was offered with two levels of equipment and trim: The Basic "Luxe" and the slightly better equipped "Confort". The "Confort" version was differentiated from the outside through the inclusion of hub-caps on the wheels. The spare wheel and jack were mounted in a special cradle under the bonnet/hood (rather than both simply being placed loose on the floor of the luggage area at the back). The interior of the "Confort" was slightly less basic, with plastic moulded door panels rather than flat, vinyl covered hardboard. The steering wheel was less "rustic" than that which the less expensive "Luxe" version of the Dyane shared with the Citroën 2CV. The extra 615 francs in the 1967 domestic market listed price for the Dyane "Confort" represented a supplement of just over 10% when compared to the list price for the more basic "Luxe".

=== Engine and running gear ===
As with the 2CV, the engine was air-cooled, with a hemispherical combustion chamber and flat-topped pistons. The Dyane was launched on its home market in August 1967, and for the first five months only the 2CV's 425 cc engine was fitted.

==== More power ====
The "Dyane 6" was announced at the Brussels Motor Show in January 1968, fitted with the Ami's 602cc M4 engine. This came with an advertised maximum output of 28 bhp (21 kW; 28 PS) (SAE), supporting a claimed top speed of 115 km/h (71 mph), which was a useful improvement over the 21 bhp (16 kW; 21 PS) (SAE) of power and the claimed top speed of 100 km/h (63 mph) with which the Dyane had been launched.

The 602 cc engined Dyane did not replace the original 425 cc engined car. However, two months later, in March 1968, the 425cc unit was replaced, in a car now described as the "Dyane 4", by an improved 435 cc engine providing 26 bhp (19 kW; 26 PS) (SAE). The extra power came from changes including not only the slight increase in cylinder dimensions, but also an extra 2 mm of carburetor diameter and a raised compression ratio. Although there was a price to be paid in terms of higher fuel consumption, the listed top speed went up to 105 km/h (66 mph) and acceleration was measurably less anæmic.

In September 1968 the M4 was replaced by an improved 602 cc engine featuring higher compression pistons and forced induction from the engine fan giving slightly more power. As with the 2CV and Ami, cooling air was ducted straight to the heater, giving excellent demisting and heating. Mechanical contact-breakers were mounted at the front of the camshaft and located behind the cooling fan. The fan was mounted on a tapered shaft and secured with a bolt at the bottom of a deep tube (the top of which engaged the starter handle). As the mounting location of the points was not obvious to the uninformed, they were often neglected. The ignition coil fired both cylinders simultaneously (wasting one spark) and the spark plug wear was significantly greater than it should have been; 6000 miles was not uncommon for a spark plug.

Cylinder heads were held on with three studs and barrels slipped over the pistons. No Cylinder-head gasket was used, and since the wings unbolted in a few minutes, it was possible to remove the cylinder heads and barrels, change the pistons or piston-rings and reassemble the top end very quickly, using only a few tools.

It was based on the same platform chassis as the Citroën 2CV, sharing its advanced independent front to rear interconnected suspension. This comprised a central springing unit, running fore-and-aft in a tube on each side; each suspension arm on that side was linked to the spring, by a tie-rod and a 'knife-edge' pivot-pin. Early cars did not have conventional shock absorbers. See Citroën 2CV for detailed information. The squeak heard from most 2CVs and Dyanes as they go over bumps is due to lack of lubrication either inside the spring tubes or to the 'knife-edges'. The front hubs kingpins need to be greased every 600 miles. Since this is often overlooked, the king-pins can be prone to wear, although some movement is acceptable.

The Dyane was also available with the "trafficlutch" - a centrifugal clutch which helped avoid stalling whilst in slow moving urban traffic.

== Specifications ==
Version	Engine	Power	Max speed
Dyane (1967–1969)	425 cc flat-2 air-cooled	21 hp (16 kW) at 5500 tr/min (rpm)	65 mph (105 km/h)
Dyane 4	435 cc flat-2 air-cooled	26 hp (19 kW) at 6750 tr/min (rpm)	68 mph (109 km/h)
Dyane 6	602 cc flat-2 air-cooled	32 hp (24 kW) at 5750 tr/min (rpm)	75 mph (121 km/h)

== Market reaction ==
The Dyane was conceived to fill a small niche between the manufacturer's 2CV and Ami models, and in due course to replace the former. The 2CV had been developed and, in 1948, launched at a time of austerity and low wages. More than twenty years later, with the much more modern Renault 4 selling strongly against the Citroën offerings, it was thought that buyers must be ready for a less aggressively basic approach. During the years since 1948 production technology had become more streamlined, as auto-industry wages grew ahead of the overall growth in the French economy, and production of the 2CV was, by the standard of more recent models, a very labour-intensive process.

During the Dyane's first full year of production, supported by the interest and marketing activity generated by new-car launch, 98,769 Dyanes were produced which meant that it was indeed produced, even at this stage, in greater volumes than the 2CV with just 57,473 cars produced. In 1969 the Dyane was again produced at a higher rate, this time with 95,434 units as against 72,044 for the older car. However, the 2CV refused to die, and with 121,096 2CVs produced in 1970, the older car was back in front. The Dyane soldiered on, with French production rates remaining more than respectable, for more than another decade. However, the Dyane's annual volumes would never again beat those of the 2CV.

=== Production figures ===
These figures indicate that any plans for the Dyane to take over from the 2CV were short-lived. These numbers exclude Yugoslavia and Iran production.

Model	1967	1968	1969	1970	1971	1972	1973	1974	1975	1976	1977	1978	1979	1980	1981	1982	1983	1984	Total
Dyane	47,712	98,769	95,434	96,456	97,091	111,462	95,535	126,854	117,913	118,871	113,474	102,958	77,605	61,745	39,176	27,960	13,908	570	1,443,493
2CV	98,683	57,473	72,044	121,096	121,264	133,530	123,819	163,143	122,542	134,396	132,458	108,825	101,222	89,994	89,472	86,060	59,673	54,923	3,867,932

== Yugoslavian manufacture ==
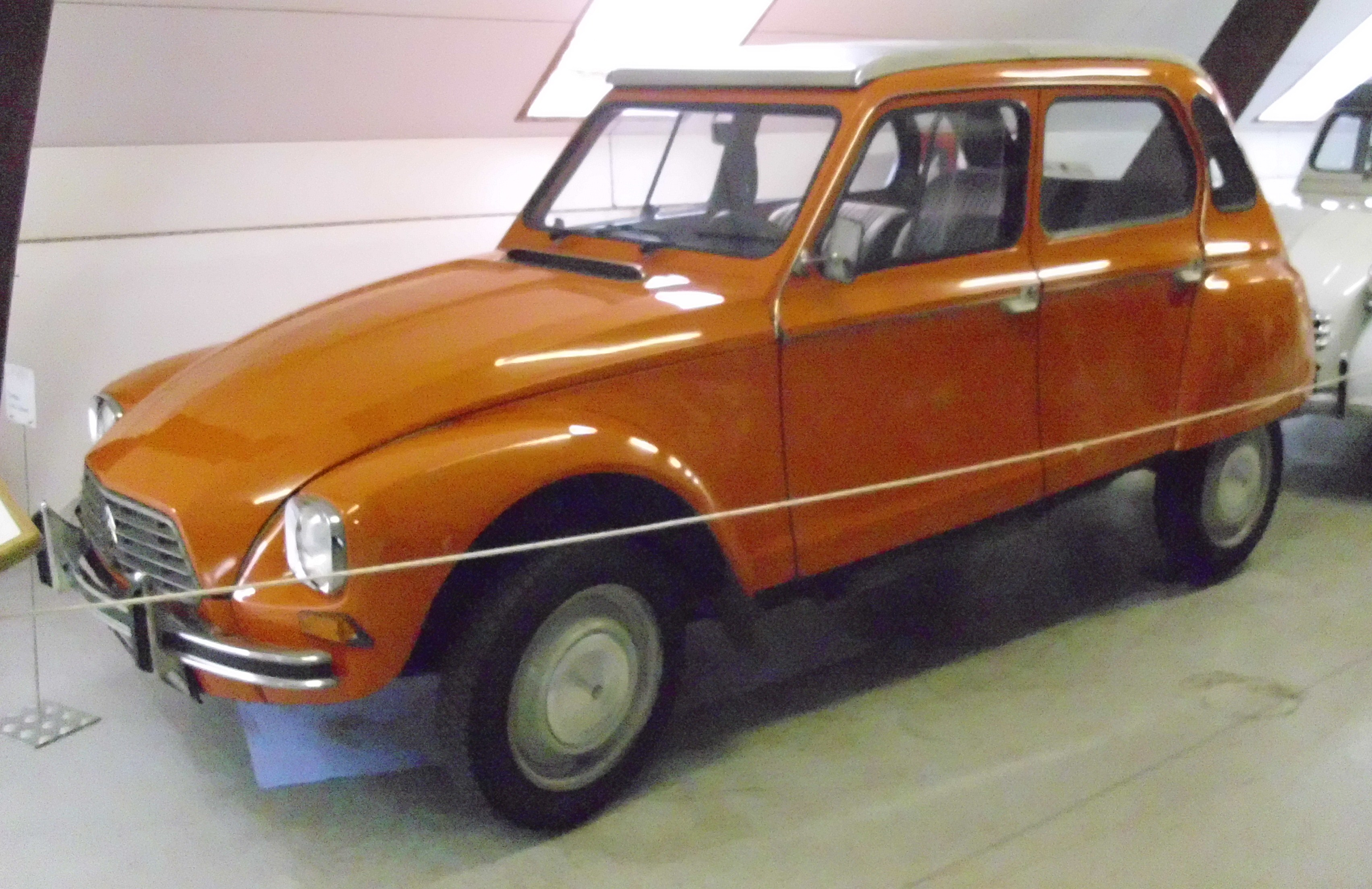
1977 Citroën Diana

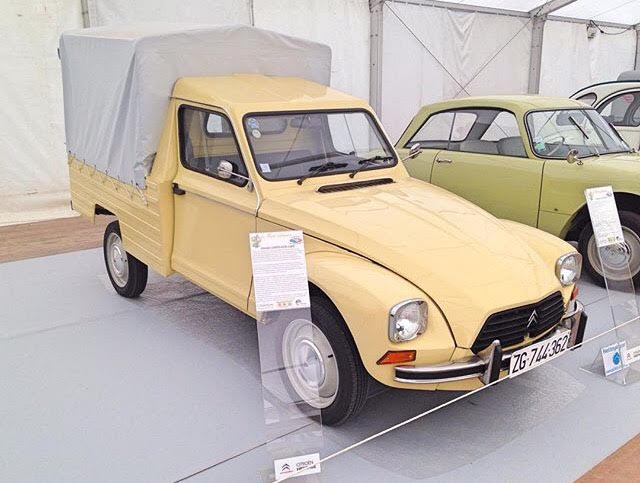
Citroën Geri

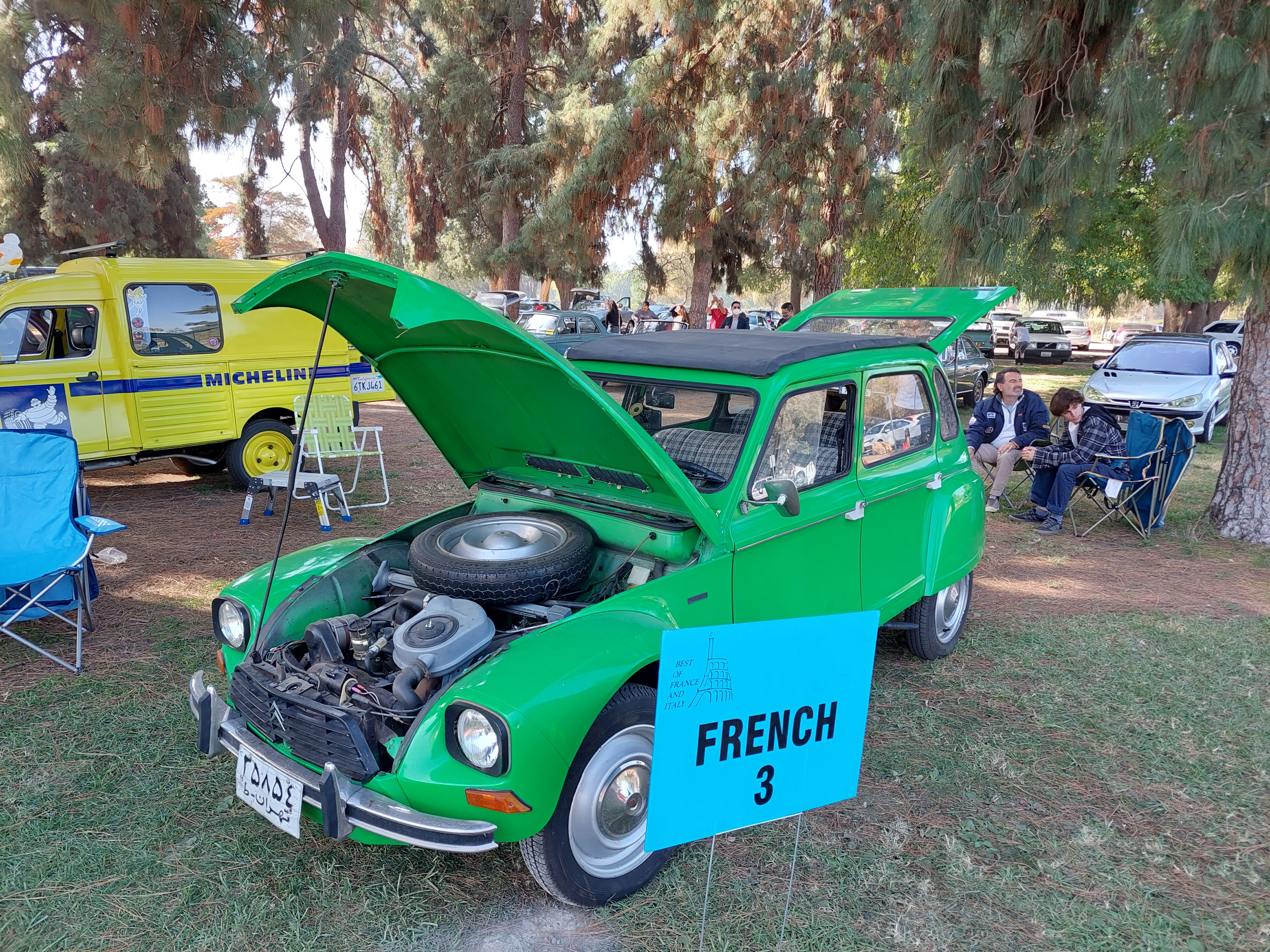
SAIPAC Jyane (also called Jian)

Tomos began assembling Citroën automobiles from kits at the Koper plant in 1959, and selling them in the Yugoslavian market. The Yugoslavian automobile market was closed, so this joint venture with a local firm allowed Citroën to access the market.

Locally assembled vehicles (from CKD kits) by Tomos included the Ami 8, 2CV6, GS, and Dyane (called the Diana). In 1972, Tomos, Iskra, and Citroën formed a new joint venture: Cimos. All cars assembled in Koper after 1972 are from CKD kits and still branded Citroën with the Citroën logo. Cimos also sold imported Citroën vehicles, the CX and Mehari. The Cimos GS can be distinguished by round headlights. Cimos also made Dak and Geri, Dyane-based utility vehicles from CKD kits.

== Iranian manufacture ==
The Dyane was also built in Iran by SAIPA from 1968 to 1980, where it was called the Jian or Jyane - a Persian word meaning "fierce" or "ferocious". Unique van and pick-up versions were also manufactured there. SAIPA built 120,000 Jyane models.

== UK press reaction ==
In the UK, a Citroën Dyane 6 tested by the British The Motor magazine in July 1969 had a top speed of 68.6 mph (110.4 km/h) and could accelerate from 0-60 mph (97 km/h) in 30.8 seconds. An overall fuel consumption of 36.0 miles per imperial gallon (7.8 L/100 km; 30.0 mpg_{‑US}) was recorded, although when driven gently the Dyane managed a class leading 51.0 miles per imperial gallon (5.54 L/100 km; 42.5 mpg_{‑US}). The test car was priced by Citroën in the UK at £648 including taxes, the same price that BMC were sticking on their Mini 1000 Super. The car was commended for its versatility, spaciousness and comfort as well as for unexpectedly good road holding and fuel economy "when not driven hard". Acceleration and top speed fell short of the class average, however. Apart from the Mini, UK market competitors identified by the journal included the Hillman Imp and the Reliant Rebel as well as the (at the time very popular ) Renault 4.

== Competitions ==
A Dyane driven by Michel Peyret and Jean-Jacques Cornelli participated in the 44th Monte Carlo Rally in 1976. Entered with number 102, it finished 80th out of 84 classified competitors and 148 starters.
