= Škoda 1200 =

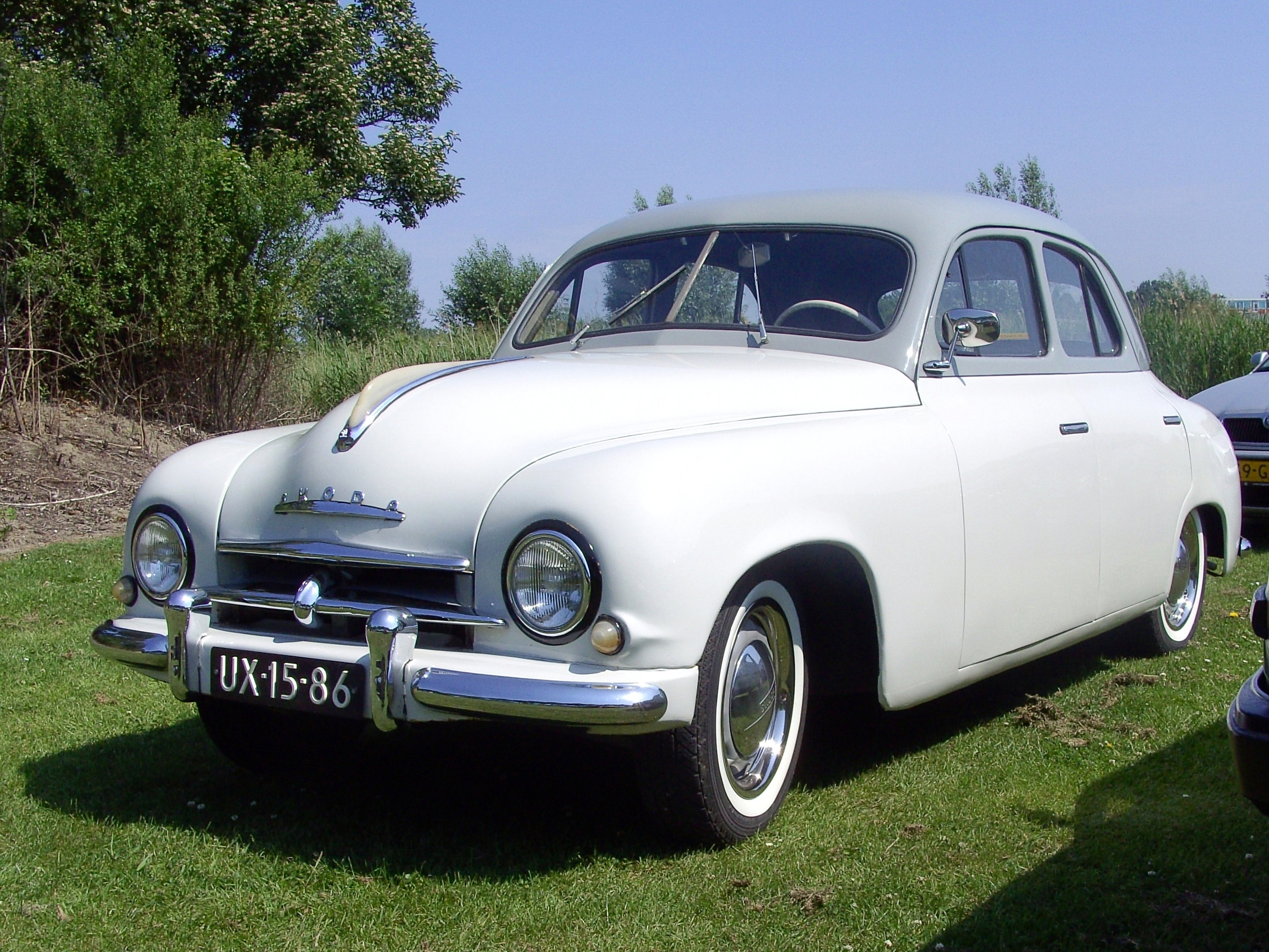

Overview
- Manufacturer: AZNP
- Production: 1952–1956
- Assembly: Mladá Boleslav, Czechoslovakia

Body and chassis
- Class: Family car
- Body style: 4-door sedan; 3-/5-door estate
- Layout: FR layout

Powertrain
- Engine: 1213 cc (74 cid) I4

Dimensions
- Wheelbase: 2695 mm (106.1 in)

Chronology
- Predecessor: Škoda 1101
- Successor: Škoda 1201

The Škoda 1200 is a family car produced by Czechoslovak automaker AZNP (Škoda Auto) from 1952 to 1956 at their plant in Mladá Boleslav. Sedan and station wagons versions were offered. The 1200 appeared in 1952 as a successor to the Škoda 1101, and was the first mass-produced Škoda to use the steel ponton format body.

The car was powered by a four-cylinder 1213 cc OHV water-cooled engine producing at maximum power 36 PS (26 kW) at 4,200 rpm. The four-speed gear box included synchromesh on the top three ratios, power being delivered to the rear wheels via a jointed prop shaft. The front suspension is independent using transverse leaf springs while the rear suspension is independent using transverse leaf springs with floating half-axles. Top speed is 105 km/h (65 mph).

The 1200 was available as a four-door saloon, three-door van or five-door station wagon. There were also about 2,000 ambulances.

Production ended in 1956.
