= Škoda 1202 =

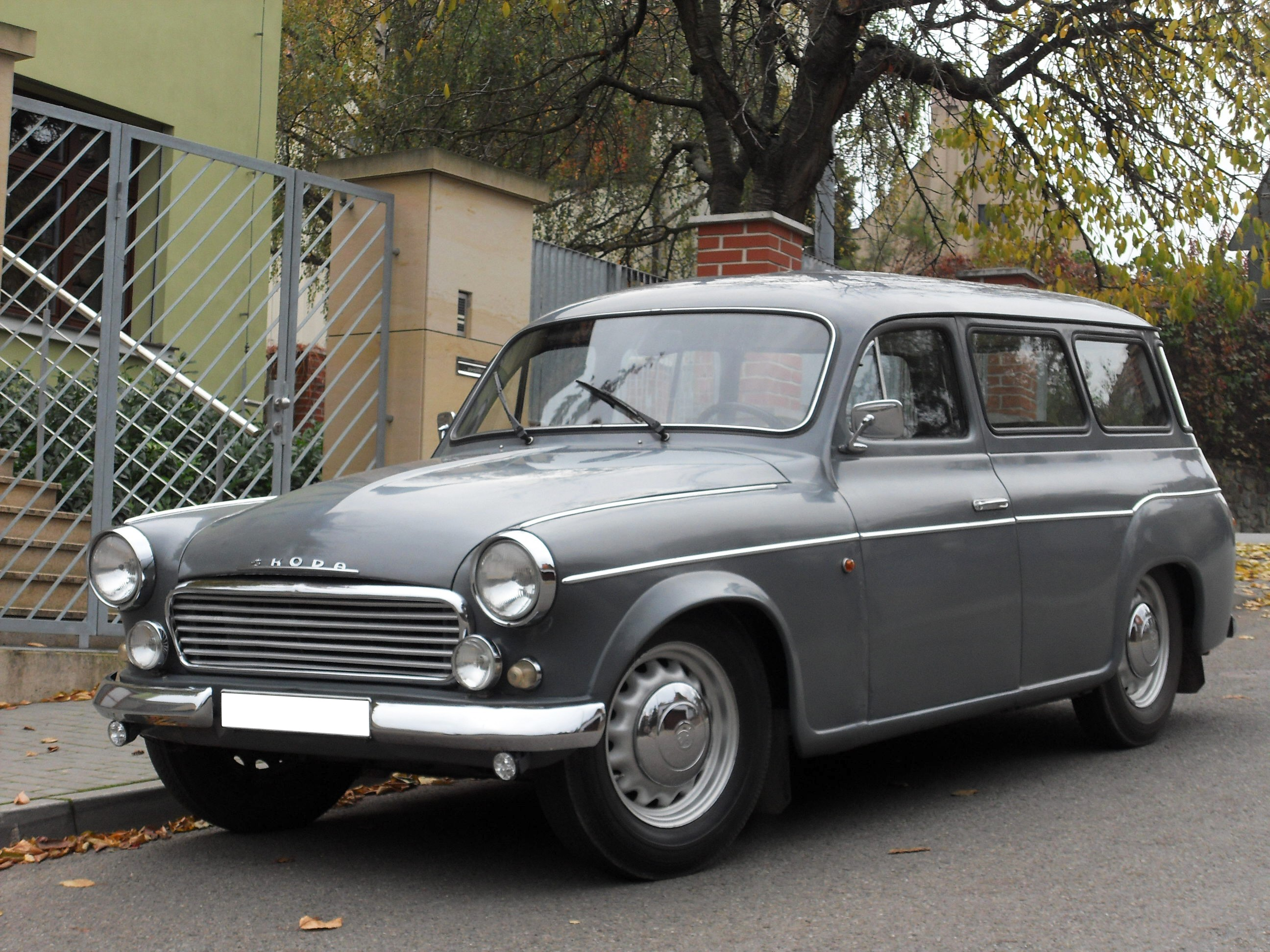

Overview
- Manufacturer: AZNP
- Production: 1961–1973; 60,141 produced

Body and chassis
- Class: Family car
- Body style: 4-door estate 3-door van 2-door pick-up
- Layout: FR layout

Powertrain
- Engine: 1.2 L I4

Chronology
- Predecessor: Škoda 1201

The Škoda 1202 is a family car that was produced as a station wagon, light panel van and pick-up (utility) by Czechoslovak automaker AZNP at their subsidiary plant in Vrchlabí. The station wagon had an unusual "asymmetric" body with one door on the driver's side and two doors on the passenger side. There was no saloon (sedan) version.

Škoda introduced the 1202 in 1961 as a successor to the station wagon and pick-up versions of the Škoda 1201. It closely resembles the slightly smaller Octavia Combi.

The car is powered by a 1221 cc four-cylinder ohv water-cooled engine delivering 34.5 kW (47 PS), inherited from its predecessor, and which later also was used in the Škoda Octavia. The four-speed gear-box included synchromesh on the top three ratios, power being delivered to the rear wheels via a jointed prop shaft. A top speed of 100 km/h (62 mph) was quoted.

Production volumes were never high, but Škoda continued to make the 1202 until 1973. The more modern Škoda 1000 MB and Škoda 100 models, produced at main plant in Mladá Boleslav, had a rear engine, which was not suitable for station wagon and van bodies.
