= Škoda 1201 =

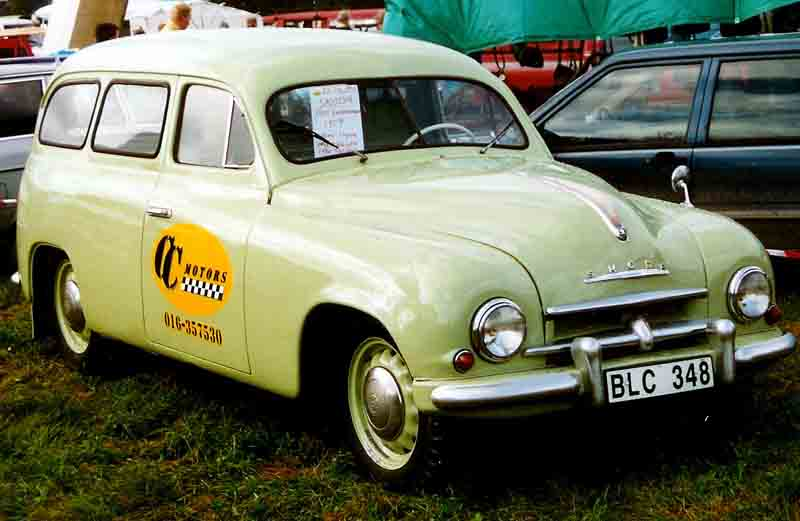

Overview
- Manufacturer: AZNP
- Production: 1954–1961

Body and chassis
- Class: Family car
- Body style: 3- or 5-door estate, 4-door saloon, 3-door panel van
- Layout: FR layout

Powertrain
- Engine: 1.2 L I4

Chronology
- Predecessor: Škoda 1200
- Successor: Škoda 1202

The Škoda 1201 was a family car produced by Czechoslovak automaker AZPN (Škoda Auto) at their plant in Mladá Boleslav. Saloon and estate versions were offered along with a panel van. The car was released in 1954 as a successor to the Škoda 1200. It inherited its predecessor's steel ponton format body. One difference was the fitting of flashing turn signal indicators, whereas the 1200 had incorporated semaphore style trafficators in its front wings: subsequent retro-fitting of flashing indicators to old 1200s has left this as an imperfect method for distinguishing between the two models, however.

The car was powered by a four-cylinder 1221 cc ohv water-cooled engine producing at maximum power 33 kW (45 PS) at 4,200 rpm. The four-speed gear-box included synchromesh on the top three ratios, power being delivered to the rear wheels via a jointed prop shaft. Top speeds of between 90 km/h (56 mph) and 105 km/h (65 mph) were quoted.

The 1201 was available as a four-door saloon and as a three- or five-door station wagon. A panel van (light delivery van) and pick-up truck version were also produced.

Production ended in 1961, which was also the year in which production began of the successor model, the Škoda 1202. It was widely exported to western nations; most cars remaining in Czechoslovakia went to government or taxi usage, with a very small number being sold to private owners.
