= Hatchback =

Car body configuration with a rear door

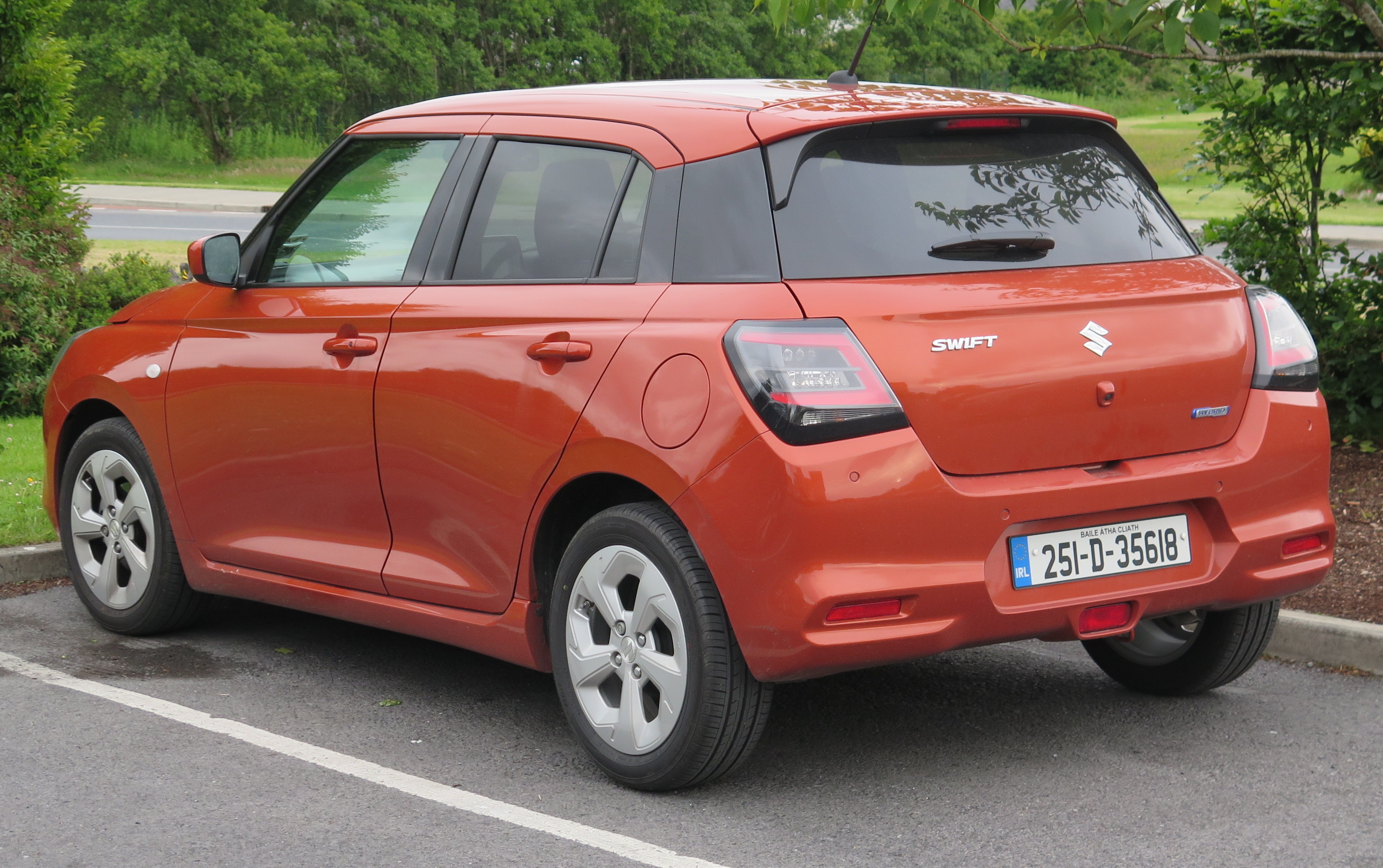
Suzuki Swift 5-door hatchback

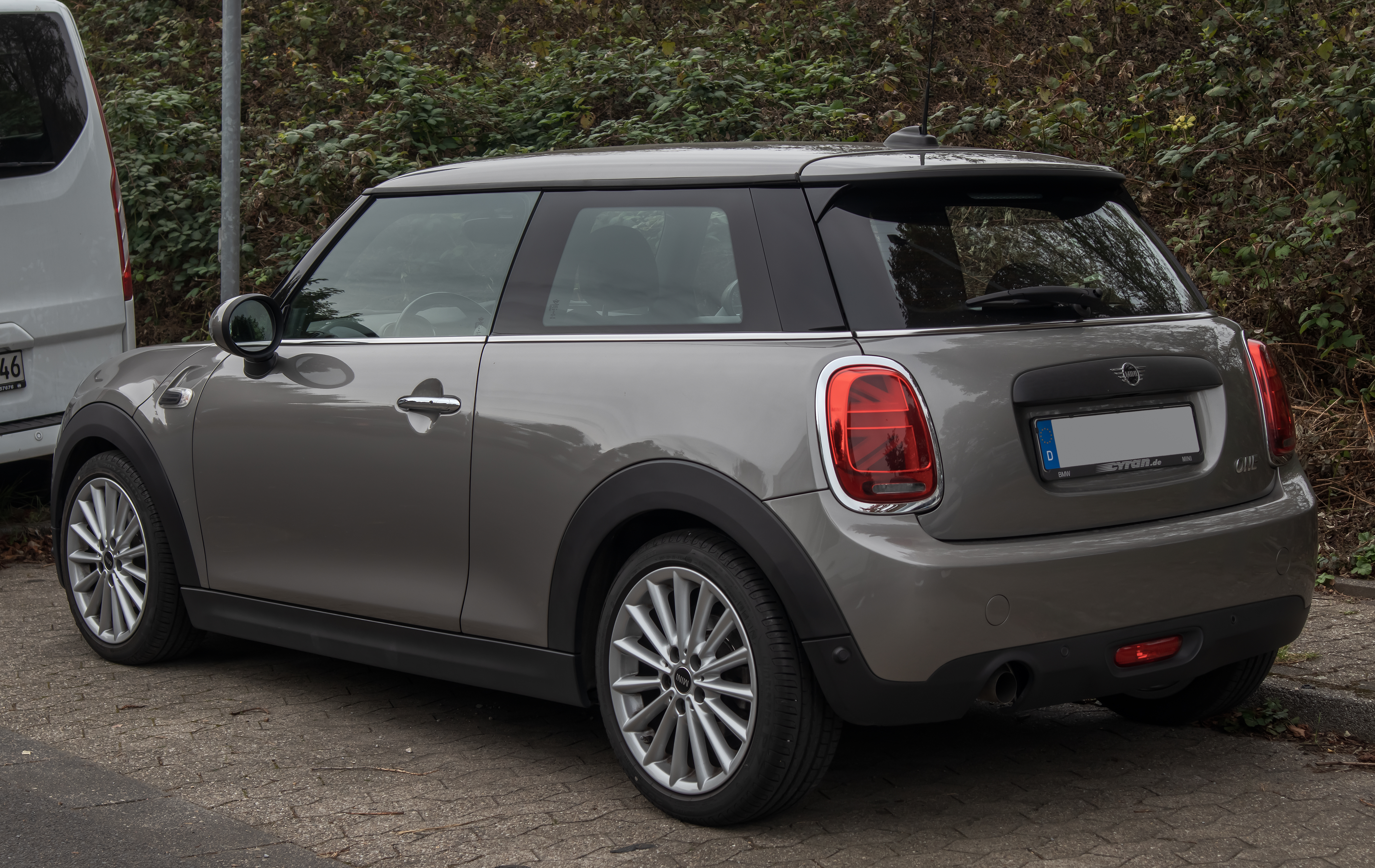
Mini Cooper 3-door hatchback

A hatchback is a car body configuration with a rear door that swings upward to provide access to the main interior of the car as a cargo area rather than just to a separate trunk. Hatchbacks may feature fold-down second-row seating, where the interior can be reconfigured to prioritize passenger or cargo volume.

While early examples of the body configuration can be traced to the 1930s, the Merriam-Webster dictionary dates the term itself to 1970. The hatchback body style has been marketed worldwide on cars ranging in size from superminis to small family cars, as well as executive cars and some sports cars. They are a primary component of sport utility vehicles.

== Characteristics ==
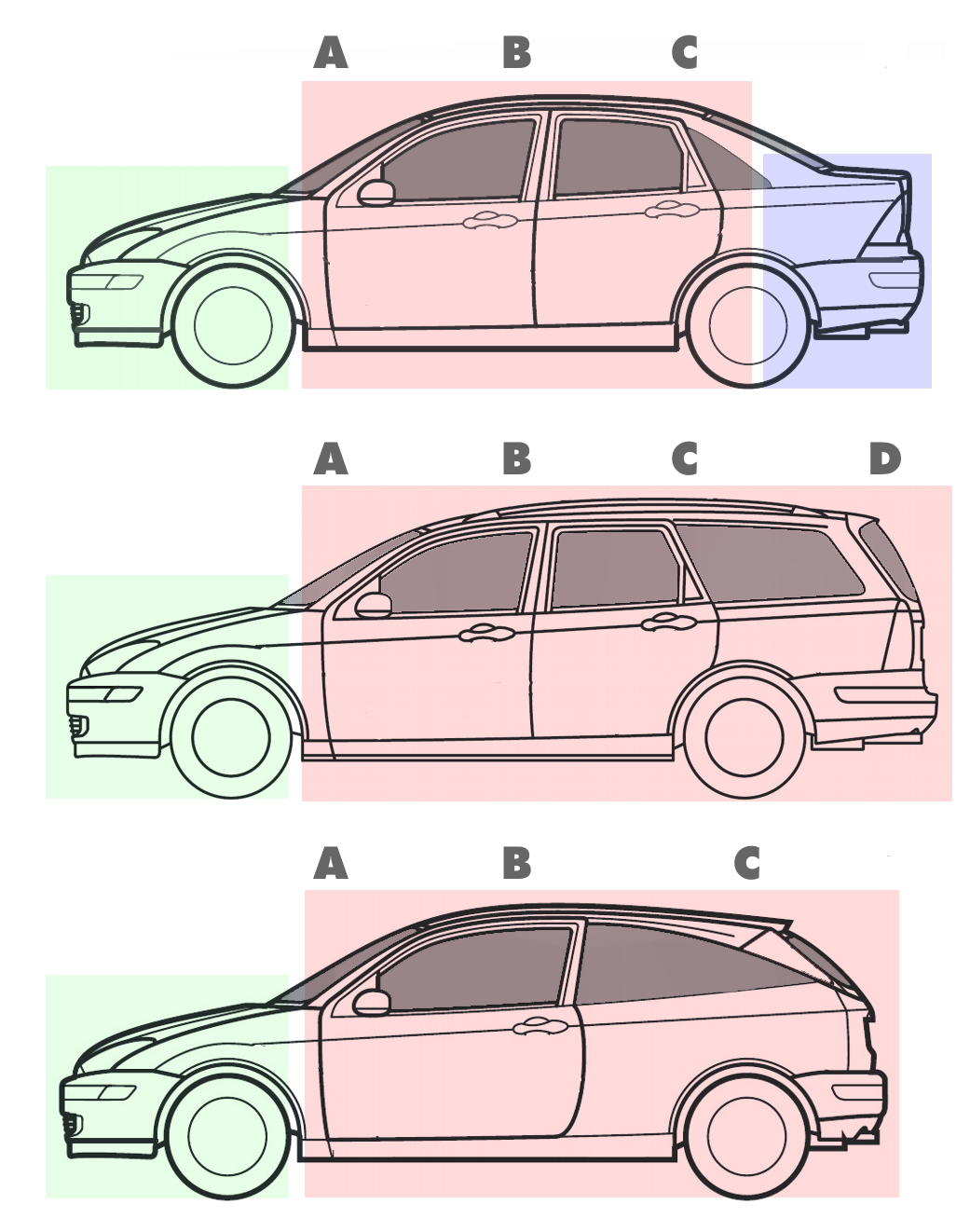
The body characteristics of a sedan (top), estate/station wagon (middle), and 3-door hatchback (bottom)

Comparison of a 5-door hatchback with a station wagon from the same model range

The distinguishing feature of a hatchback is a rear panel or door that opens upwards and is hinged at roof level (as opposed to the boot/trunk lid of a saloon/sedan, which is hinged below the rear window). Most hatchbacks use a two-box design body style, where the cargo area (trunk/boot) and passenger areas are a single volume. The rear seats can often be folded down to increase the available cargo area. Hatchbacks may have a removable rigid parcel shelf, or a flexible roll-up tonneau cover to cover the cargo space behind the rear seats.

=== Terminology ===
Doors on passenger cars allow for ingress (entering) and egress (exiting). In automobiles, doors are designed to meet ergonomic and safety regulations, such as mandates on hinges and latches that prevent ejection during a crash. Car doors allow ease of entry for people and are subject to requirements to permit emergency evacuation. Powered doors, such as on modern electric vehicles, require a mechanical or backup manual release device for egress even if the car loses electrical power or is involved in a collision. For example, the United States National Highway Traffic Safety Administration (NHTSA) explains the term "back door" as: "a door or door system on the back end of a passenger car through which cargo can be loaded or unloaded. The term includes the hinged back door on a hatchback or a station wagon." On hatchbacks, the interior release is not required by Standard No. 401 which requires an interior release to facilitate occupant release. Back doors designed for passenger use are regulated, and Standard No. 206 requires a back door with an interior door handle (or door release mechanism or latch release control) to have a locking mechanism.

Some manufacturers count the rear hatch as a door: a hatchback with two passenger doors may be called a three-door, and a hatchback with four passenger doors may be called a five-door.

=== Estates vs. liftbacks vs. notchbacks ===
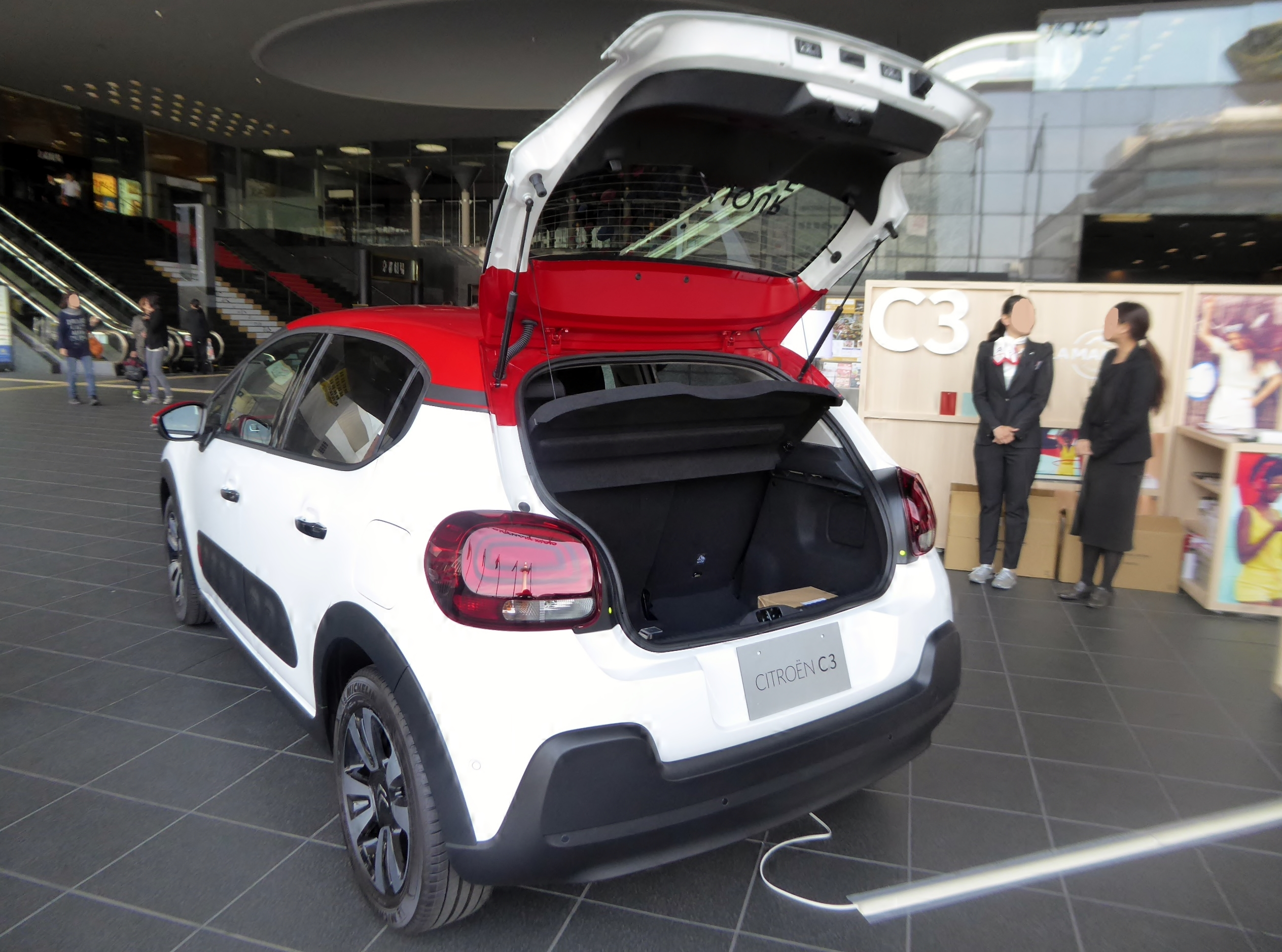
2017 Citroën C3 pictured, a tailgate hinged at the roof is a predominant characteristic of hatchbacks and estates/station wagons

Estates/station wagons and liftbacks have in common a two-box design configuration, a shared interior volume for passengers and cargo and a rear door (often called a tailgate in the case of an estate/wagon) that is hinged at roof level. In addition to the top hinged access to the cargo area, various tailgate designs include a rear window rear window opening upward and the lower part folding down, a retractable rear window into the tailgate that opens downward extending the cargo floor or could swing open to the side to facilitate cargo access.

Liftback cars are a type of hatchback, but differ from traditional hatchbacks in their styling, with a more sloped roofline. The term "fastback" may sometimes also be used by manufacturers to market liftback cars. A fastback is a broad automotive term used to describe the styling of the rear of a car in having a single slope from the roof to the rear bumper.

Some hatchbacks are notchback three box designs, bearing a resemblance to sedans/saloons from a styling perspective, but being closer to hatchbacks in functionality by having a tailgate hinged from the roof. This is featured on cars such as the 1951 Kaiser-Frazer Vagabond, Simca 1100, Mazda 6 GG1, and Opel Vectra C. As such, notchbacks are not fastbacks, as the roofline slope on a notchback is interrupted by its three-box design.

An estate/wagon typically differs from a liftback or hatchback by being longer (therefore more likely to have a D-pillar). Other potential differences of a station wagon include:

- steeper rake at the rear (i.e., the rear door is more vertical)
- a third row of seats
- rear suspension designed for increased load capacity or to minimize intrusion into the cargo area
- the tailgate is more likely to be a multi-part design or extend down to the bumper

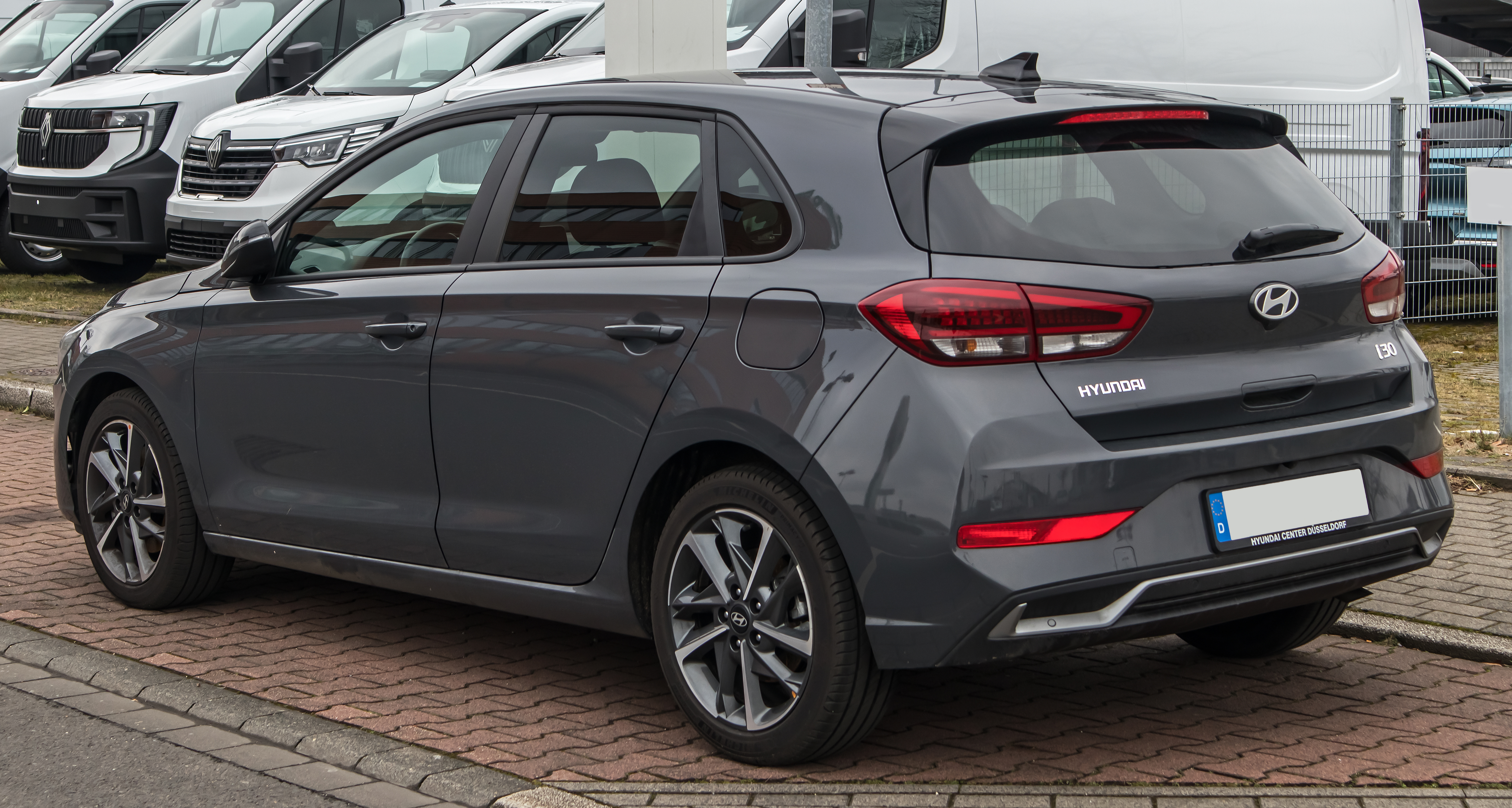
Hyundai i30 as a conventional 5-door hatchback

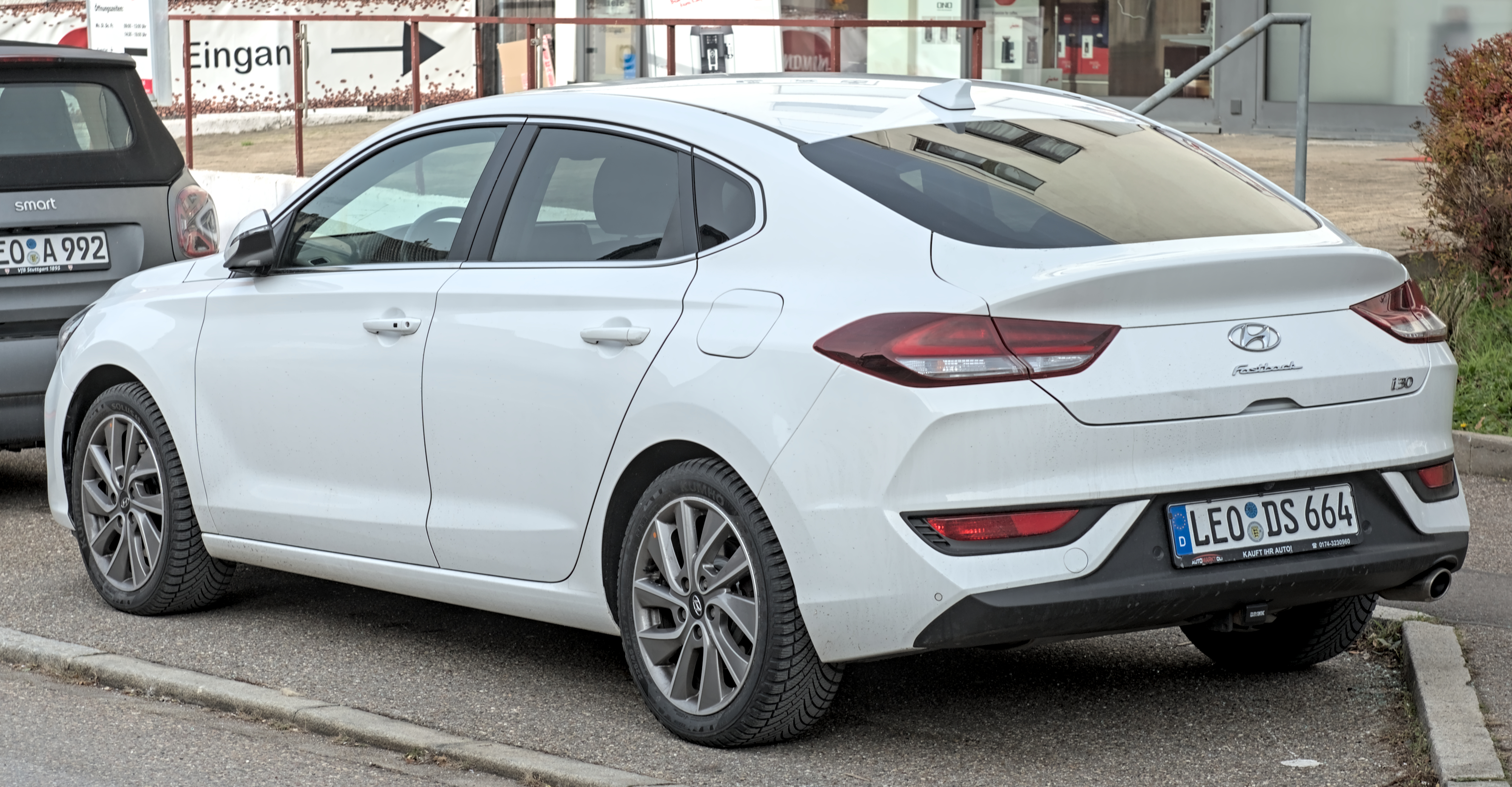
Hyundai i30 fastback, with a liftback tailgate. The tailgate and roofline are sloped at a more horizontal angle than on a traditional hatchback.

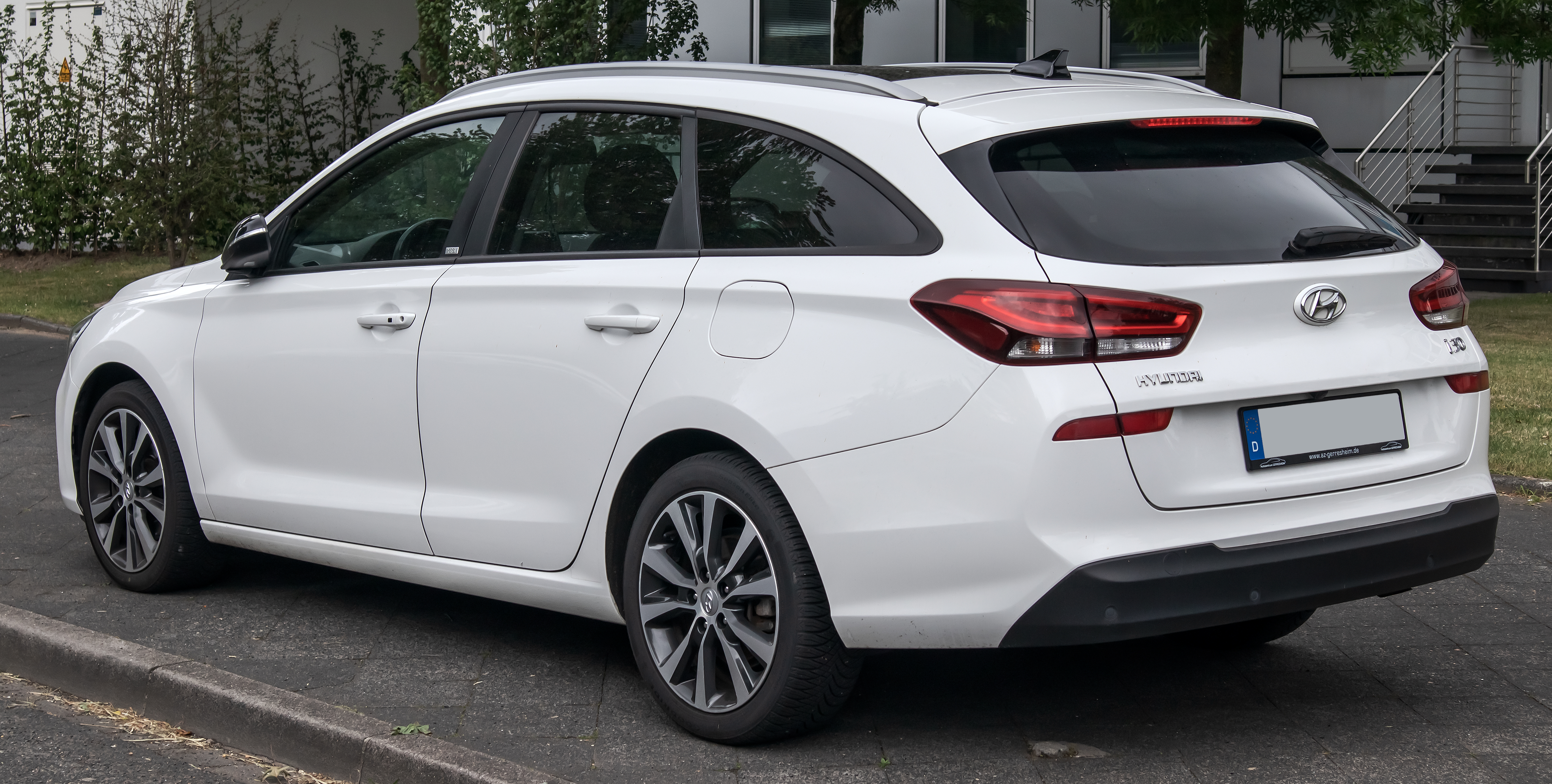
Hyundai i30 estate/station wagon. The roofline extends further to the rear.

=== Liftback ===
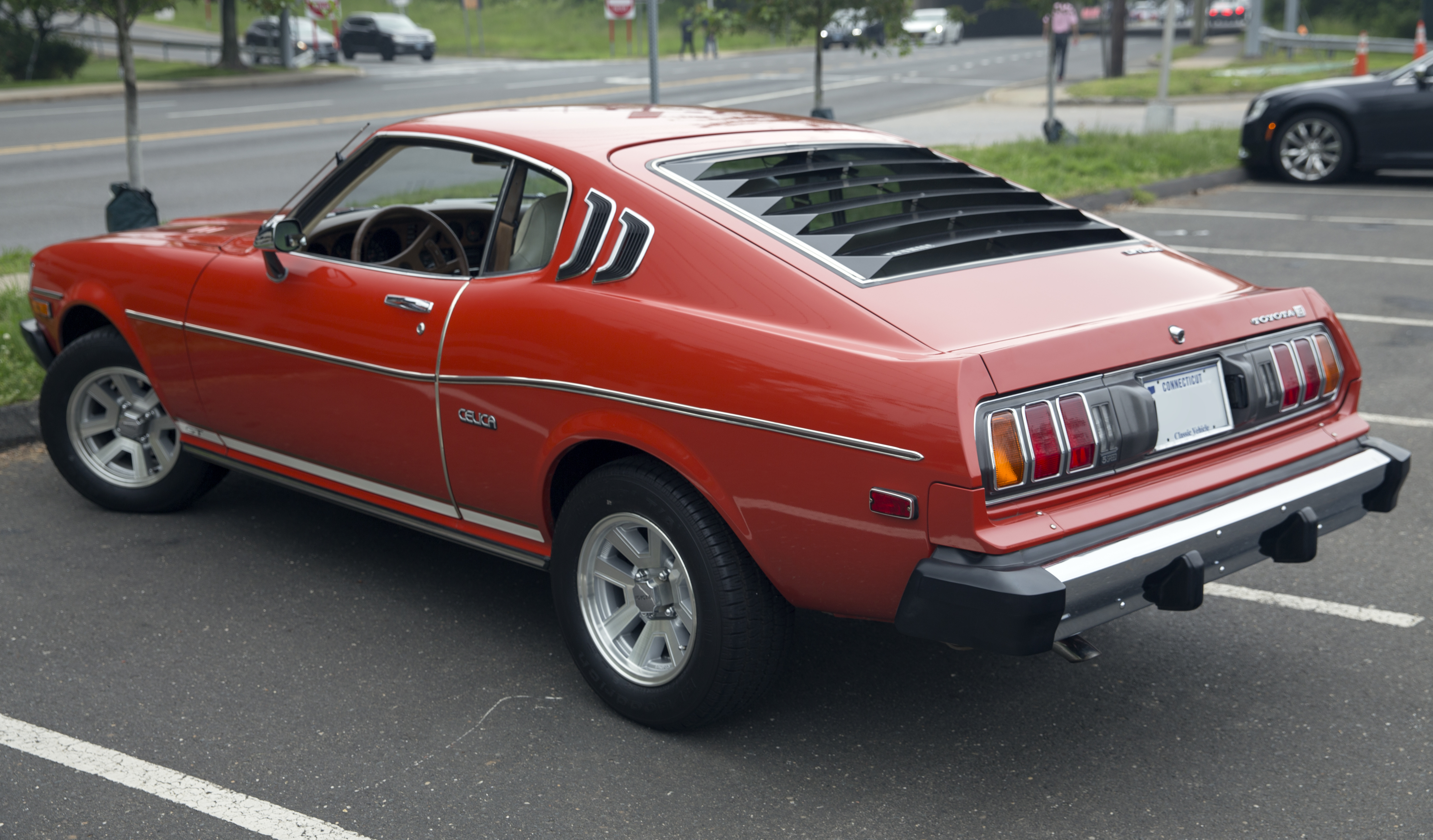
1976 Toyota Celica GT Liftback U.S. Model

Liftback is a term for hatchback models in which the rear cargo door or hatch is more horizontally angled than on an average hatchback, and as a result, the hatch is lifted more upwards than backward to open.

The term was used by Toyota in 1973 to describe the Toyota Celica Liftback GT design.

Toyota called the new body style a Liftback, signifying that it was a three-door hatchback rather than a two-door coupe. With its sloping fastback roofline, the Celica Liftback was, if anything, even less habitable for rear-seat passengers than was the hardtop, but the hatchback roof and folding rear seat made the Liftback more versatile for quotidian chores or the sort of "active lifestyle" pastimes that so fascinate advertising copywriters.

Later, Toyota needed to distinguish between two 5-door versions of the Toyota Corolla: one a conventional five-door hatchback with a nearly vertical rear hatch, and the other a five-door, more horizontal hatch, for which the term Liftback was used.

Saab called a similar body style of their cars a combi coupé, starting from 1974.

== History ==
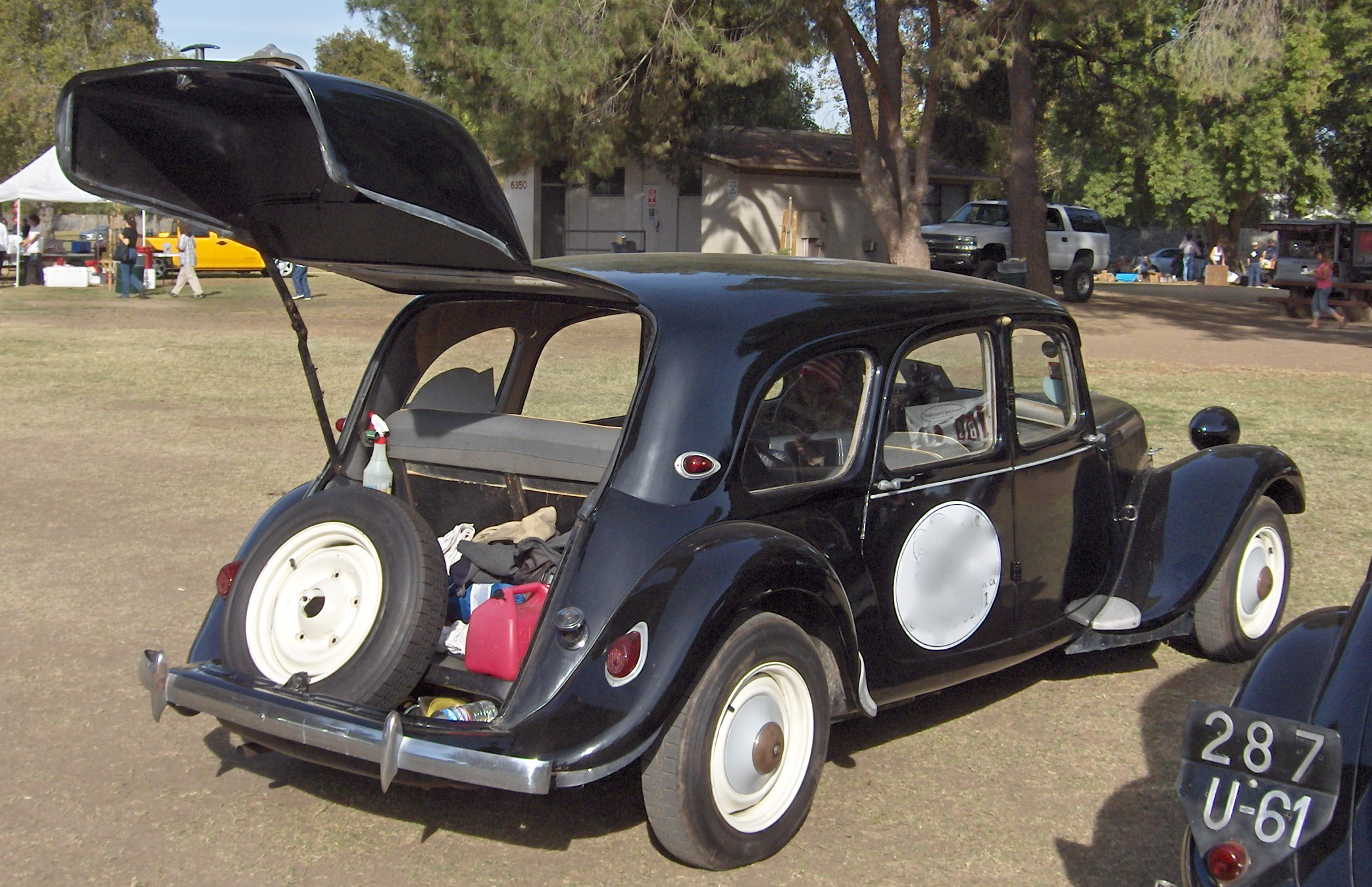
1938 Citroën Traction Avant Commerciale - 1952 shape is shown.

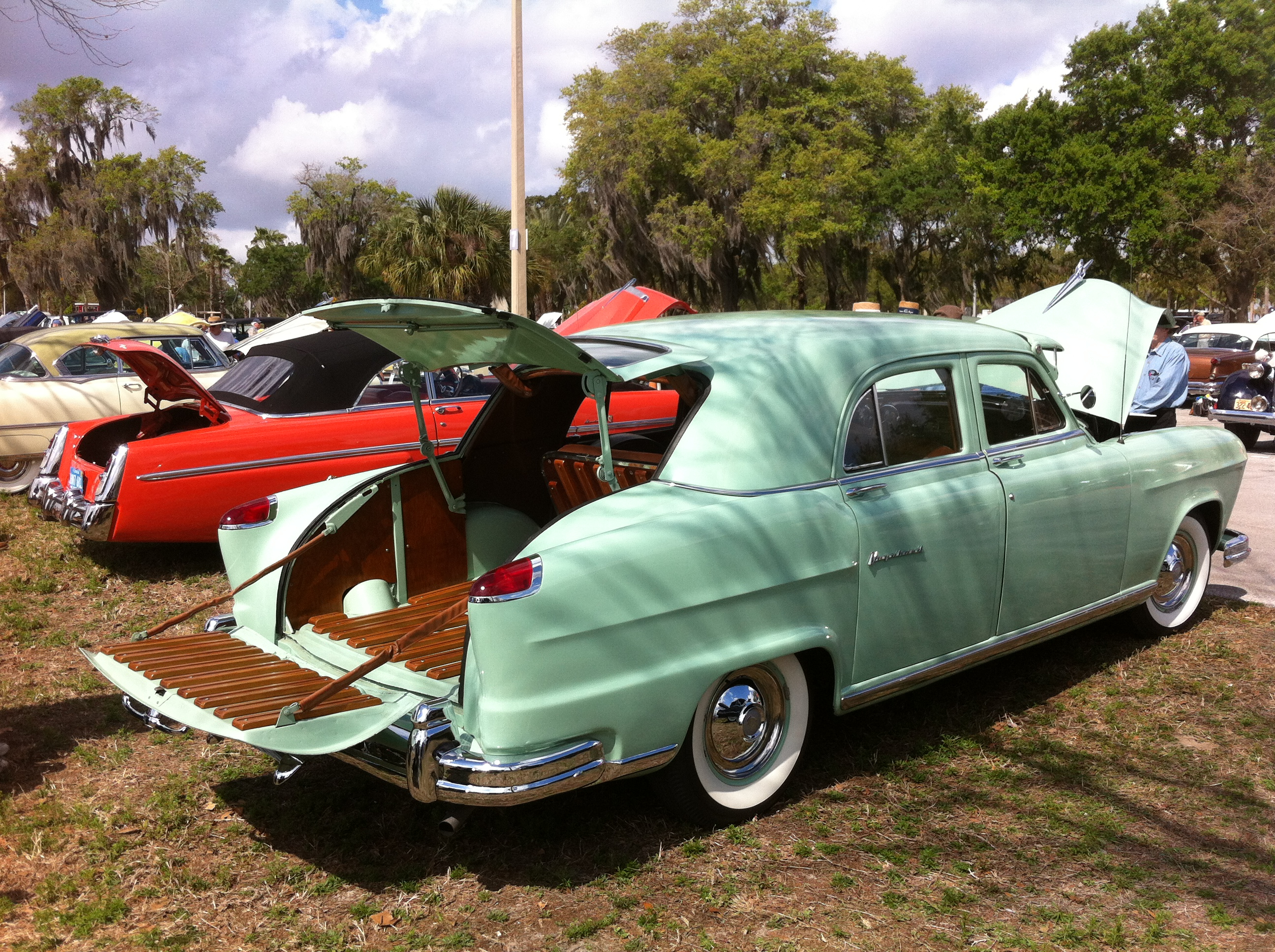
1951 Kaiser-Frazer Vagabond

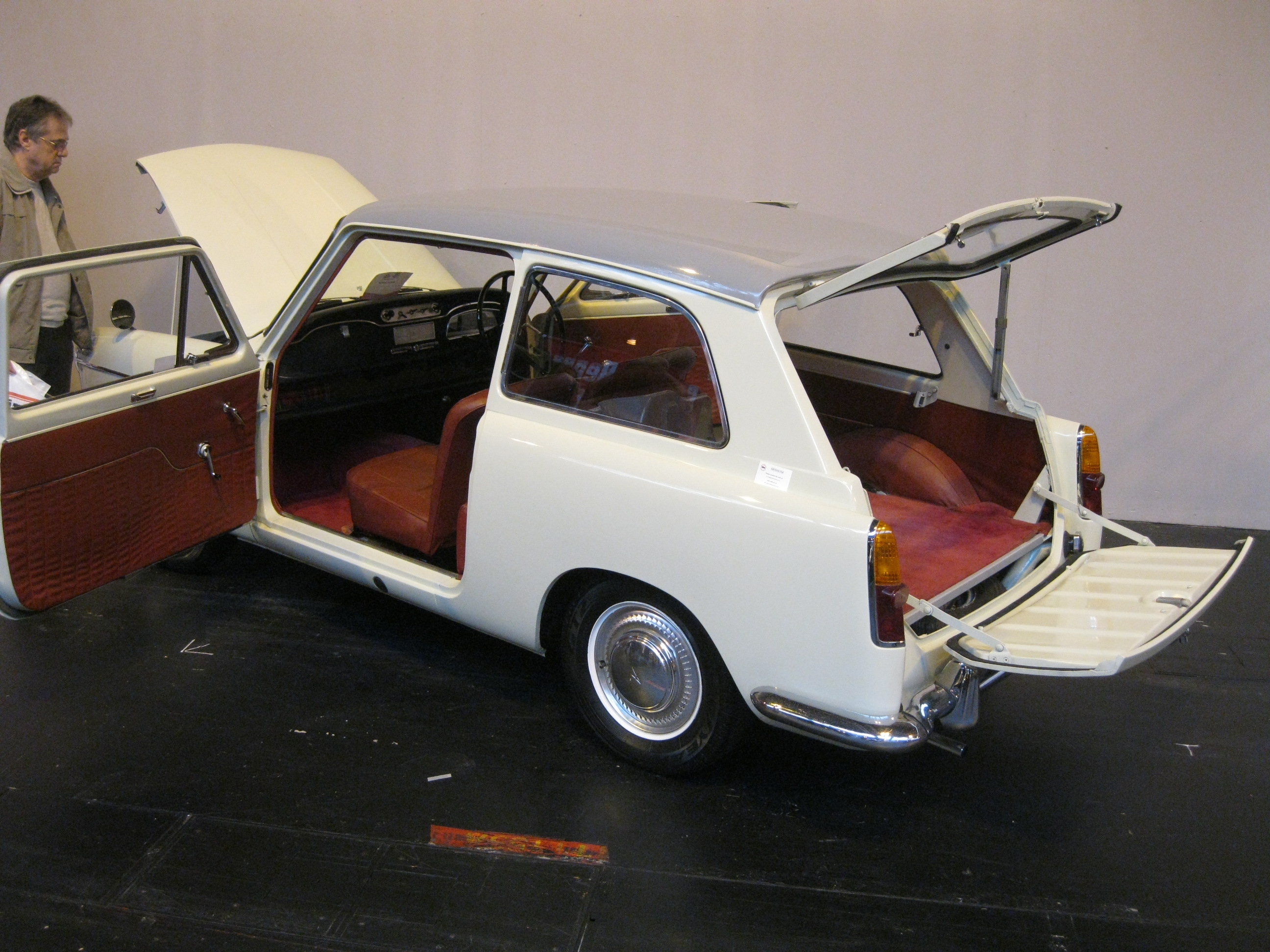
1959 Austin A40 Farina Countryman

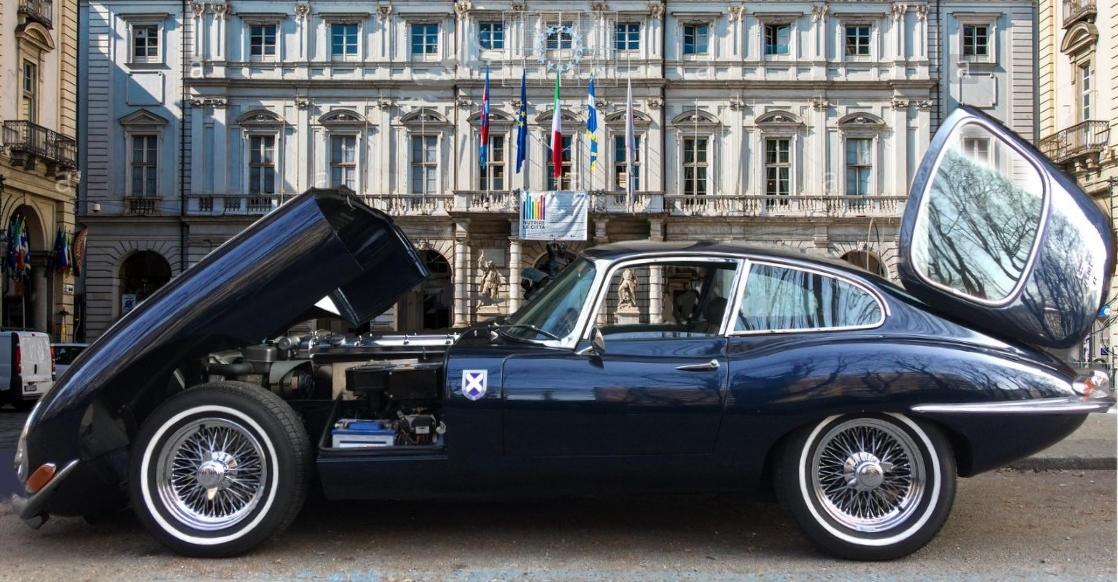
1966 Jaguar E-Type with side opening hatch

=== History ===
The first production hatchback was made by Citroën in 1938: the (11CV) "Commerciale" version of their 1934–1957 Citroën Traction Avant series. The initial target market was tradesmen who needed to carry bulky objects, like butchers, bakers, vintners, and grocers. Before World War II, the tailgate had two pieces, a top section hinged from roof level and a bottom section hinged from below. When production of the Commerciale resumed after the war, the tailgate became a one-piece design that was hinged from roof level, the design used on most hatchbacks since.

In 1949, Kaiser-Frazer introduced the Vagabond and Traveler hatchbacks. These models were styled much like a typical 1940s sedan, fully retaining their three-box profile; however, they included a two-piece tailgate like the first Citroën 11CV Commerciale. The Vagabond and Traveler models also had folding rear seats and a shared volume for the passengers and cargo. The design was neither fully a sedan nor a station wagon, but the folding rear seat provided for a large, 8-foot (2.4 m) long interior cargo area. These Kaiser-Frazer models have been described as "America's First Hatchback".

The British Motor Corporation (BMC) launched a 'Countryman' version of the Austin A40 Farina two‑box economy car in 1959. Just like its A30 and A35 Countryman predecessors, it was a very small estate car — but instead of regular, sideways opening rear doors, it had a horizontally split tailgate, having a top-hinged upper door and bottom-hinged lower door. The 1959 A40 Countryman differed from the 1958 A40 Farina saloon, in that the rear window was marginally smaller, to allow for a frame that could be lifted with roof-mounted hinges and side support struts so that the car now incorporated a horizontal-split two-piece tailgate. The lower panel was now flush with the floor and its bottom-mounted hinges were strengthened.

=== Sports cars ===
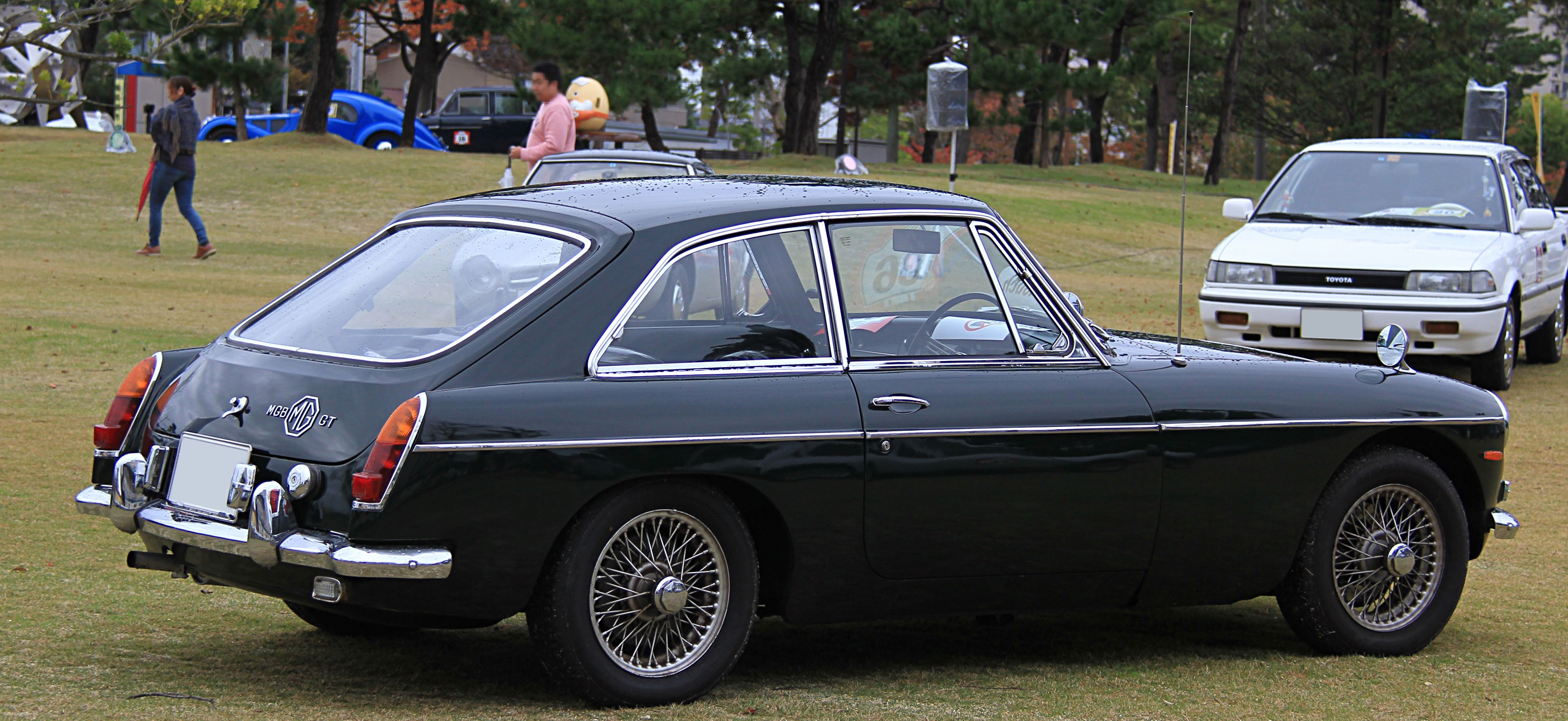
MG MGB offered a rear hatch GT coupé version in late 1965.

In 1953, Aston Martin marketed the DB2 with a top-hinged rear tailgate, manufacturing 700 examples. Its successor, the 1958 DB Mark III, also offered a folding rear seat. The 1954 AC Aceca and later Aceca-Bristol from AC Cars had a similar hatch tailgate, though only 320 were built.

In 1965, MG had Pininfarina modify the MGB roadster into a hatchback design called the MGB GT, becoming the first volume-production sports car with this type of body.

Many coupés have 3 doors, including the Jaguar E-Type and Datsun 240Z.

=== Mass market acceptance ===
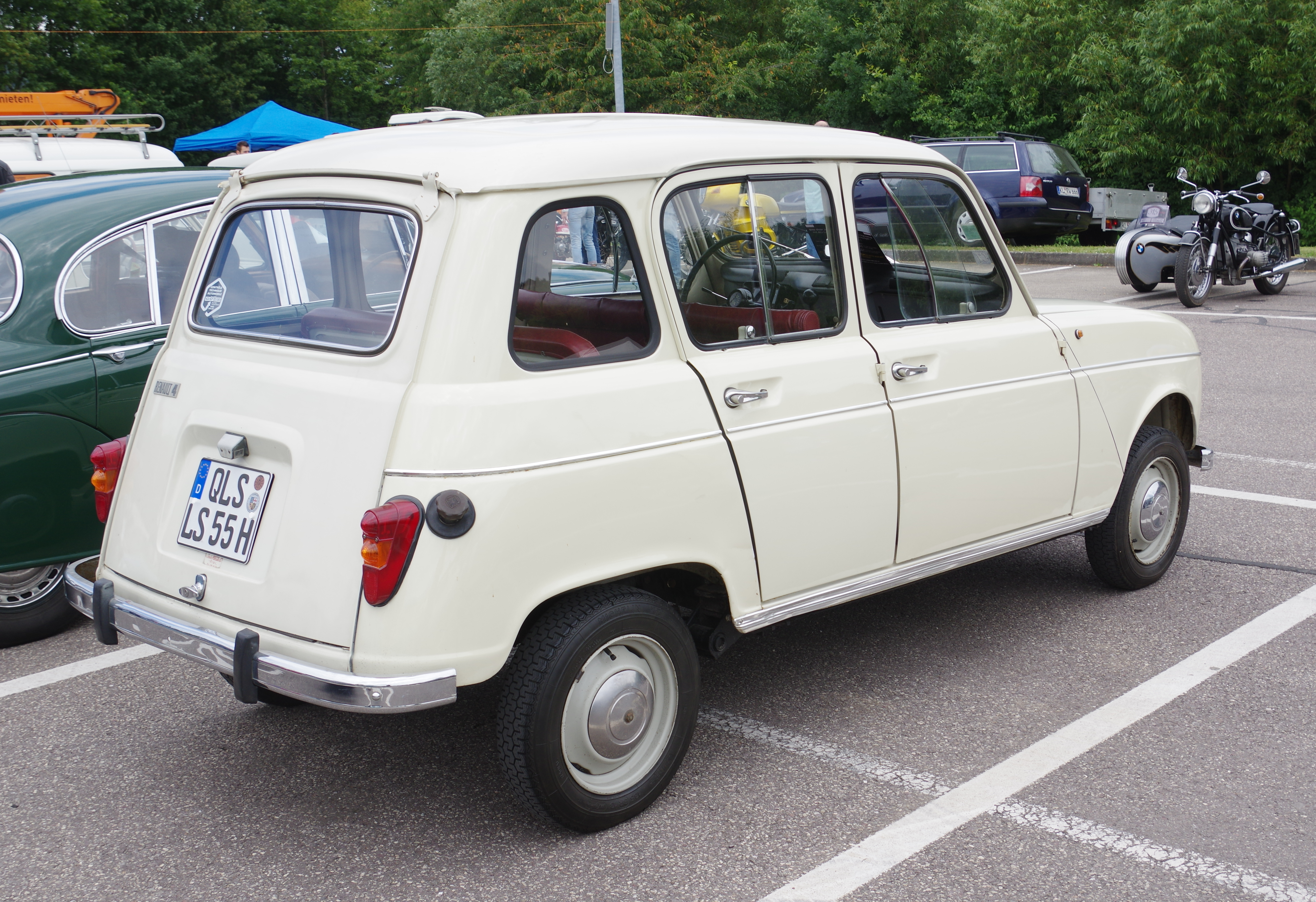
1961 introduced Renault 4

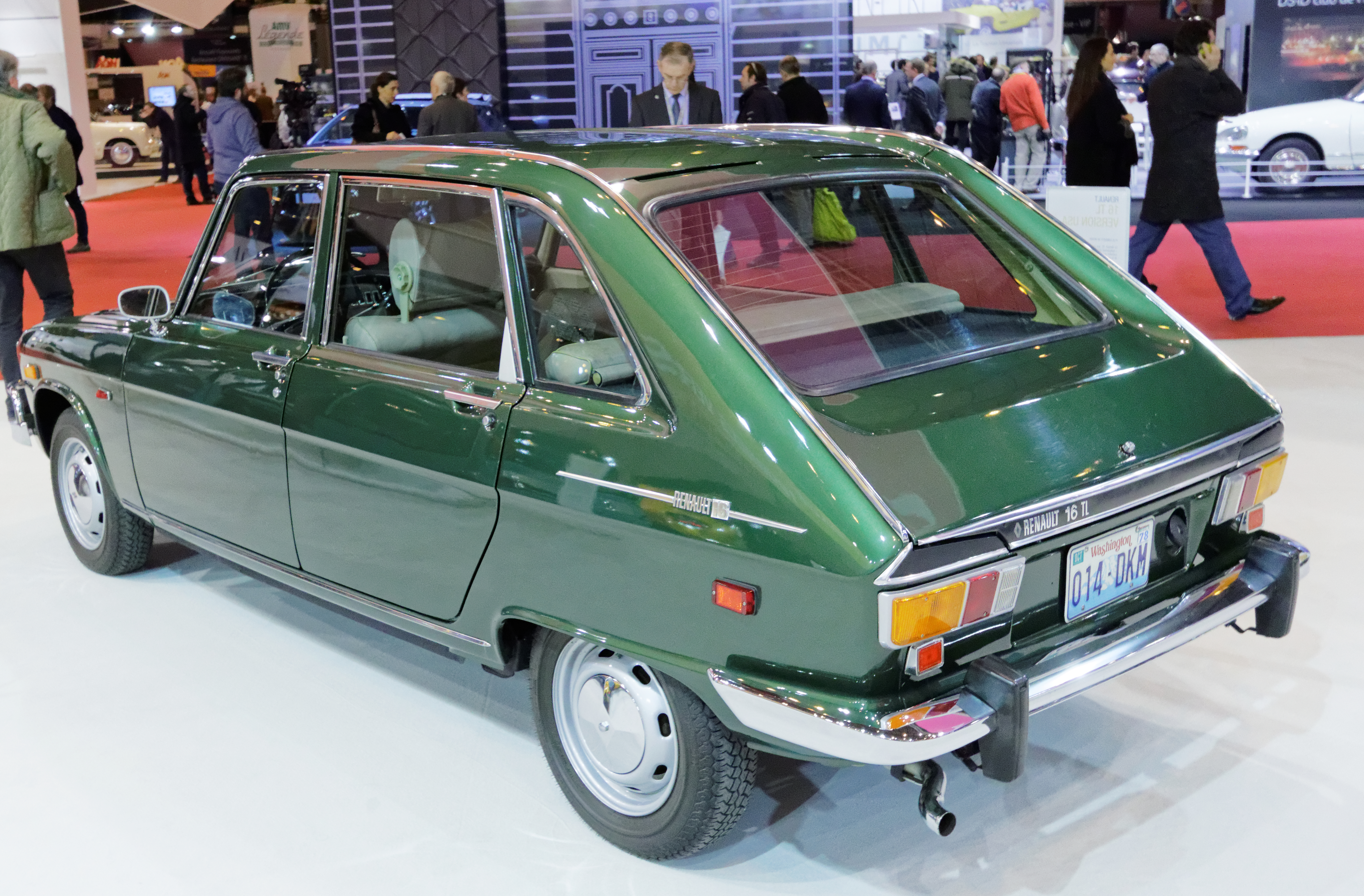
1965 introduced Renault 16 — the brand's top saloon in the later 1960s

In 1961, Renault introduced the Renault 4 as a moderately upscale alternative to the Citroën 2CV. The Renault 4 was the first million-selling, mass-produced, compact two-box car with a steeply raked rear side, opened by a large, one-piece, lift-gate hatch.

During its production life cycle, Renault marketed the R4 calling it a small station wagon, just like Austin's series of small Countryman estate models from 1954 until 1968 – even after the term "hatchback" appeared around 1970. The company only offered one two-box body style. The Renault 4 continued in production through 1992, selling over 8 million cars.

In 1965, the R4 economy car was complemented by the D-segment Renault 16, the first volume production two-box, hatchback family car. Its rear seats were adjustable, would fold down, or could be completely removed. The Renault 16 was successful in a market segment previously exclusively populated by notchback sedans and, despite making only one body style for 15 years, consumers purchased over 1 3/4 million R16s.

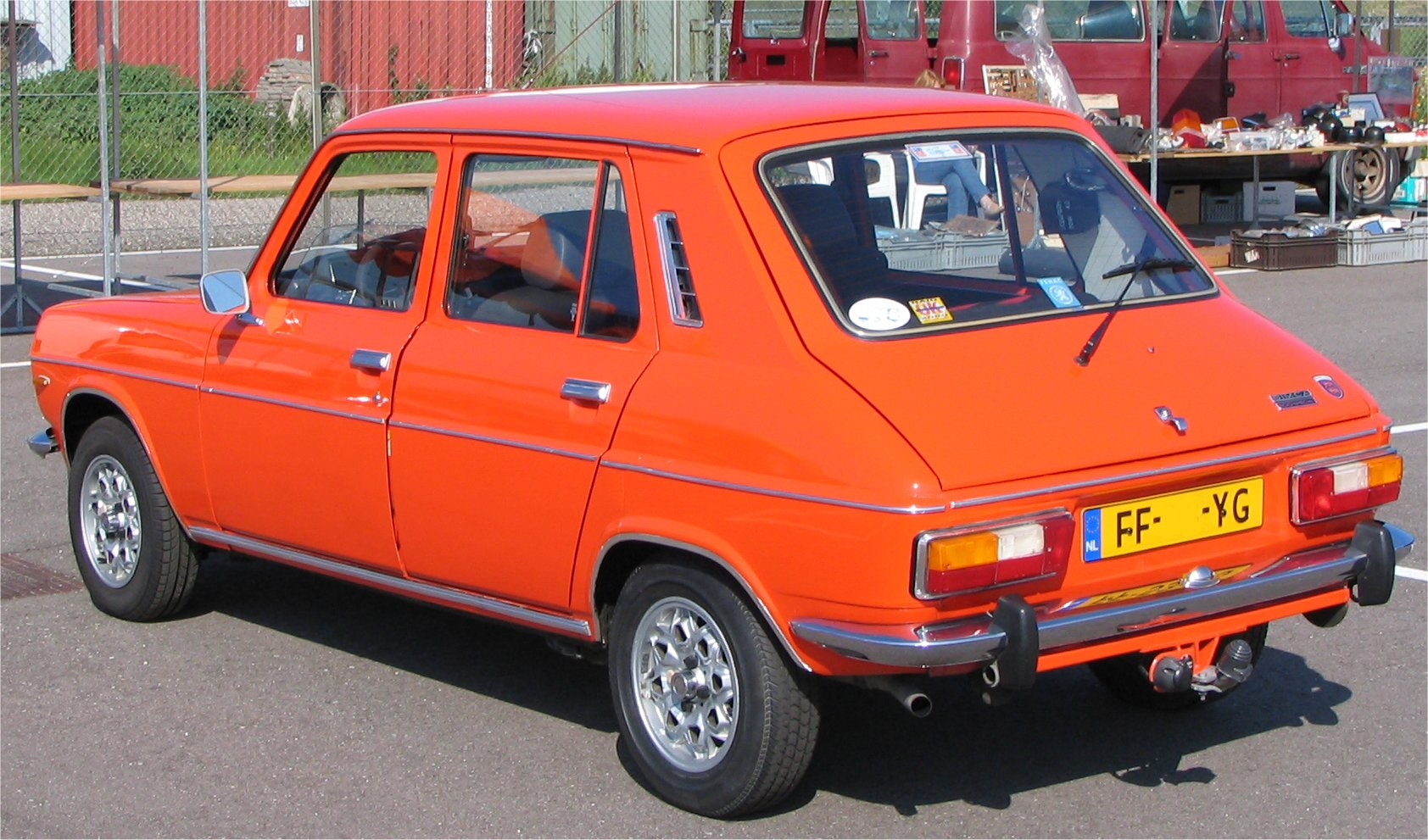
1967 introduced Simca 1100

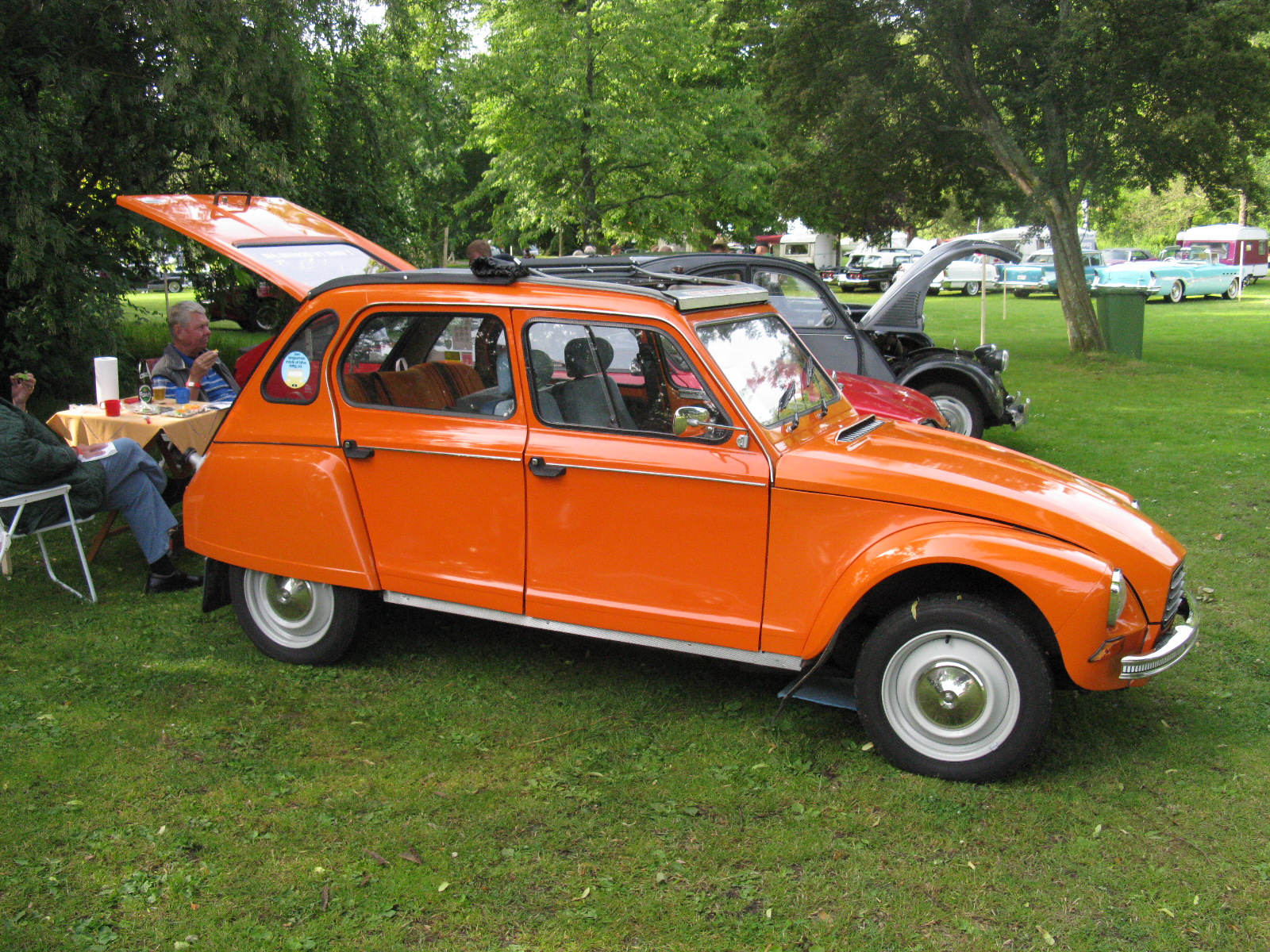
1967 introduced Citroën Dyane

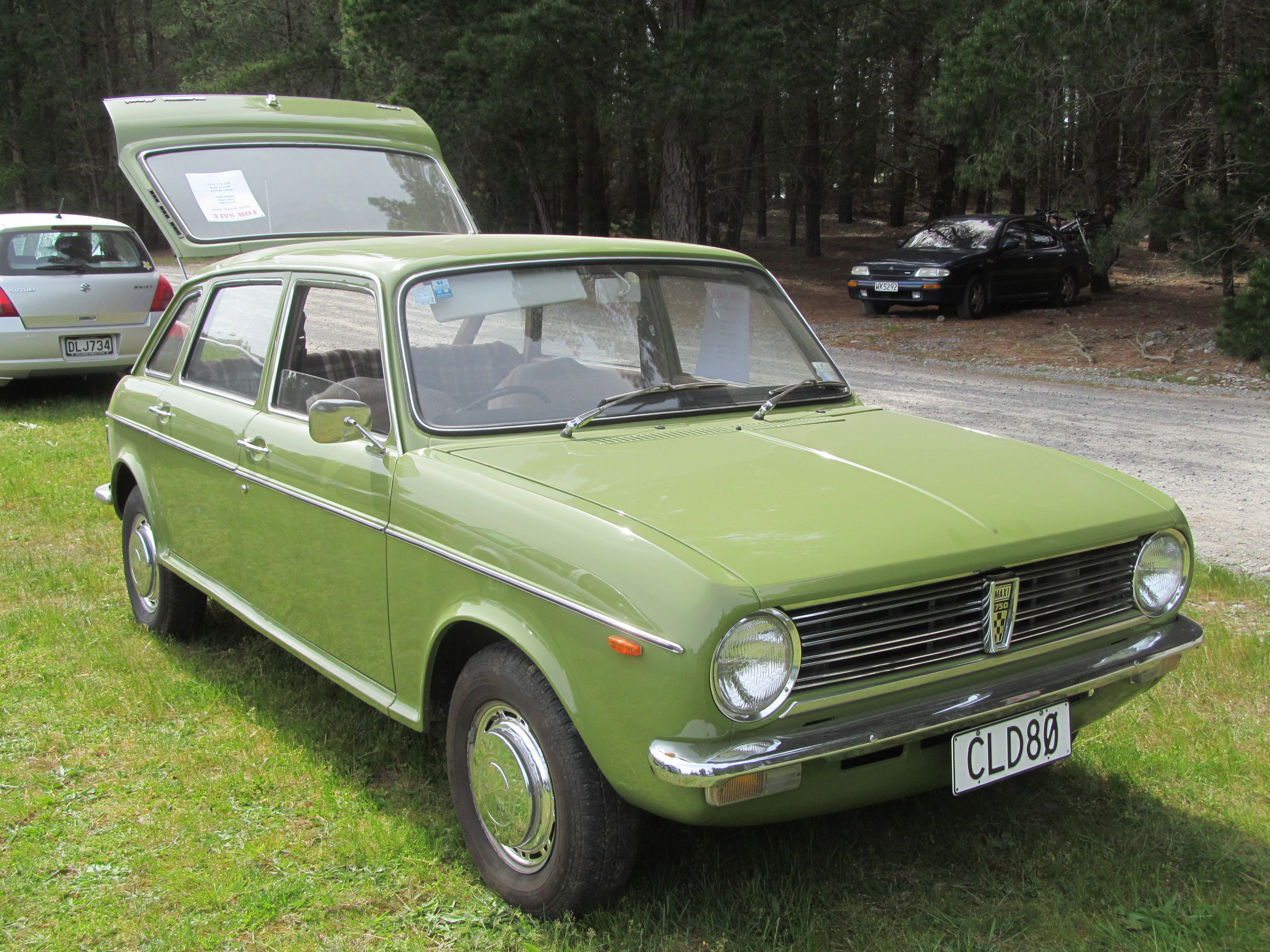
1969 introduced Austin Maxi

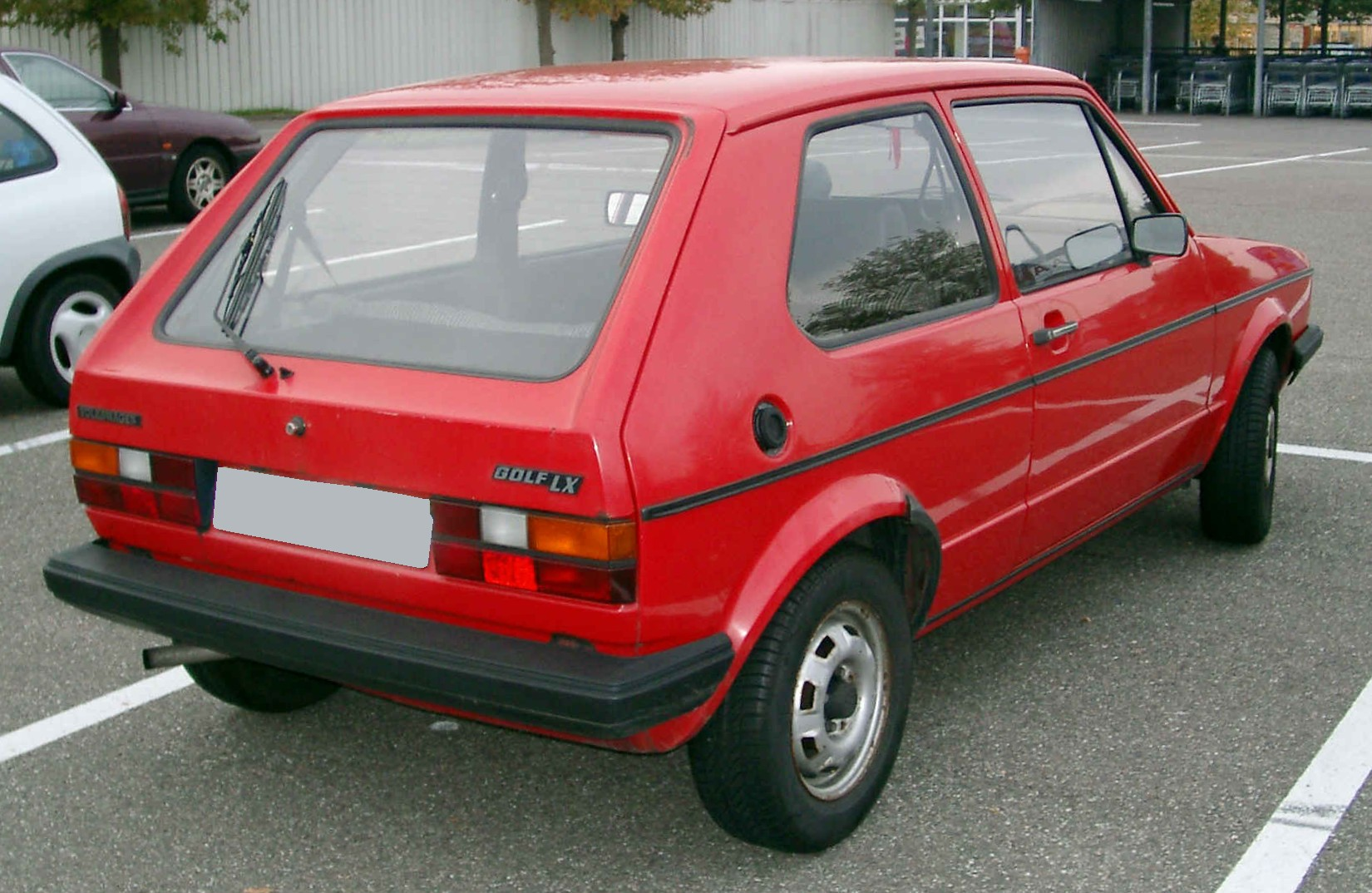
1974 introduced Volkswagen Golf

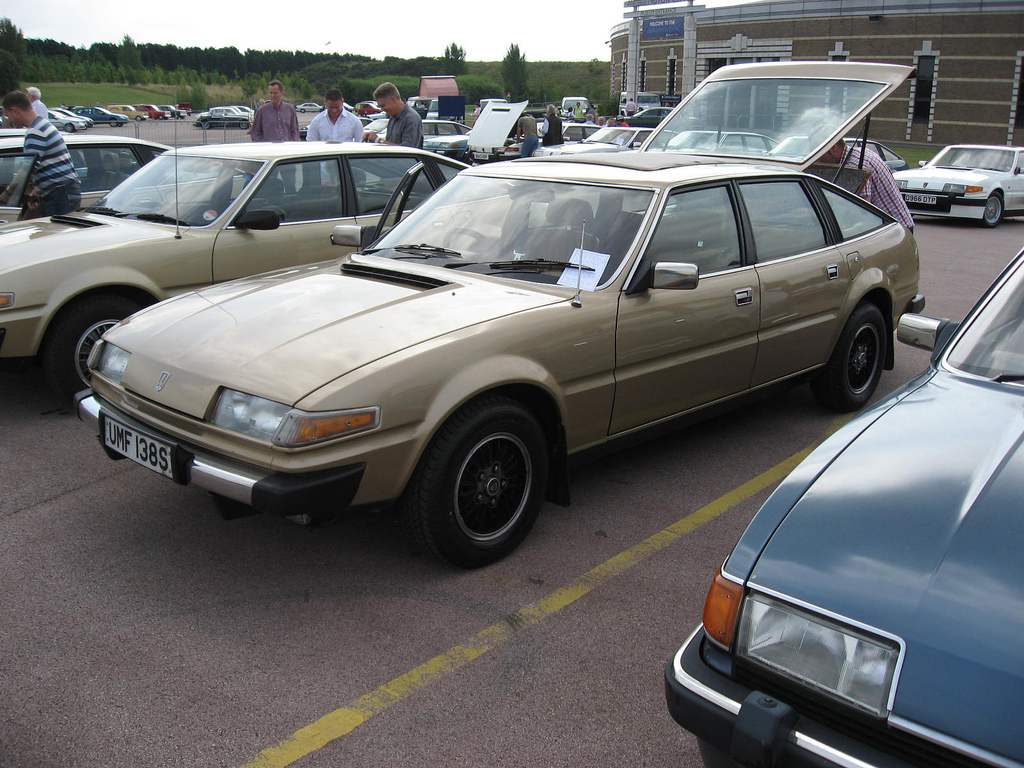
1975 Rover 3500 5 door hatchback

=== Modern hatchbacks ===
Unlike the Renault 4, which had a semi-integrated body, mounted on a platform chassis, and a front mid-mounted and longitudinally placed engine behind the front axle, the 1967 Simca 1100, which followed in the footsteps of the 1959 BMC Mini with front-wheel drive, a more space-efficient transverse engine layout, unitary bodywork, and independent suspension (features which became key design concepts used by almost every mass-market family car since) - and it was the first hatchback with these features. The Simca 1100 also came in both three and five-door variants, and the hatchback models took a central position, traditionally taken up by saloons, in a full model line-up, completed by a station wagon, as well as panel van versions.

Also in 1967, Citroën released the Dyane, a redesigned 2CV with a large rear hatch, to compete with the Renault 4.

The Simca was closely followed by Mini's larger stablemate, the Austin Maxi. Counting the rear hatch made it a five-door saloon. It featured a transverse-mounted SOHC engine, a five-speed transmission, and a flexible seating arrangement which gave the option of forming a double bed. Created by the same designer as BMC's Mini, sir Alec Issigonis – accountants had determined that the car had to use the same set of doors as the Austin / Morris 1800, but would be marketed below it in the model range, so needed a shorter rear body. A curtailed rear end with a big hatch resulted. The Austin Maxi operated in the same market segment as the Renault 16, and the two competitors were closely matched in specifications and exterior dimensions, although the Maxi had significantly more interior space due to its transverse engine.

In 1974, the Volkswagen Golf was introduced, intended to replace the ubiquitous Beetle.

In 1976, British Leyland introduced the Rover 3500, a rear wheel drive executive car five-door hatchback.

=== Europe ===
Increasing demand for compact hatchbacks in Europe during the 1970s led to the release of models such as the Austin Ambassador, Austin Maestro, Fiat 127, Saab 99 and Renault 5. By the late 1970s and early 1980s, the majority of superminis and compact cars had been updated or replaced with hatchback models.

Hatchbacks were the mainstay of manufacturers' D-segment offerings in Europe in the 1990s (they were already popular in the 1980s) and until the late 2000s. It was common for manufacturers to offer the same D-segment model in three different body styles: a 4-door sedan, a 5-door hatchback, and a 5-door station wagon. Such models included the Ford Mondeo, the Mazda 626/Mazda6, the Nissan Primera, the Opel Vectra/Insignia, and the Toyota Carina/Avensis. There were also models in this market segment available only as a 5-door hatchback or a 4-door sedan, and models available only as a 5-door hatchback or a 5-door station wagon. Often the hatchback and the sedan shared the same wheelbase and the same overall length, and the full rear overhang length of a conventional sedan trunk was retained on the five-door hatchback version of the car.

The 1989–2000 Citroën XM and second-generation Skoda Superb (2008–2015) are cars that blur the line between hatchbacks and sedans. They feature an innovative "Twindoor" trunk lid. It can be opened like in a sedan, using the hinges located below the rear glass; or together with the rear glass, like in a hatchback, using the hinges at the roof.

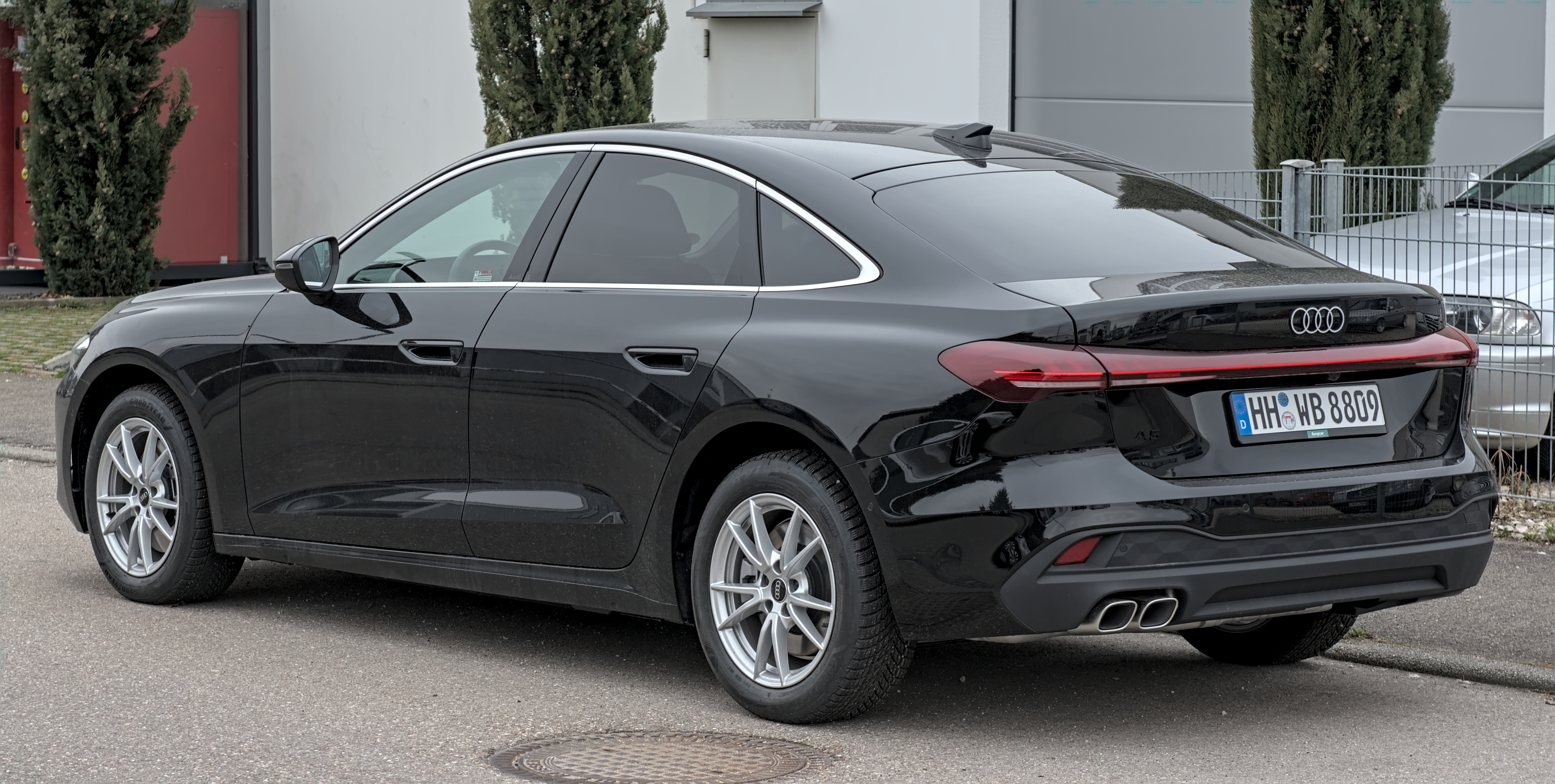
A5 Sportback

Audi and BMW introduced hatchbacks in 2009, but marketed them as "Sportback" (Audi) or "Gran Turismo"/"Gran Coupe" (BMW).

In the 2010s hatchback versions became available on luxury cars such as the BMW 5 Series Gran Turismo, Porsche Panamera, and Audi A7 while the Skoda Octavia was always available as a hatchback. Meanwhile, three-door hatchbacks have seen a fall in popularity, compared with 5-door models. This has led to many models no longer being offered in 3-door body styles, for example, the Audi A3 and Renault Clio.

=== North America ===
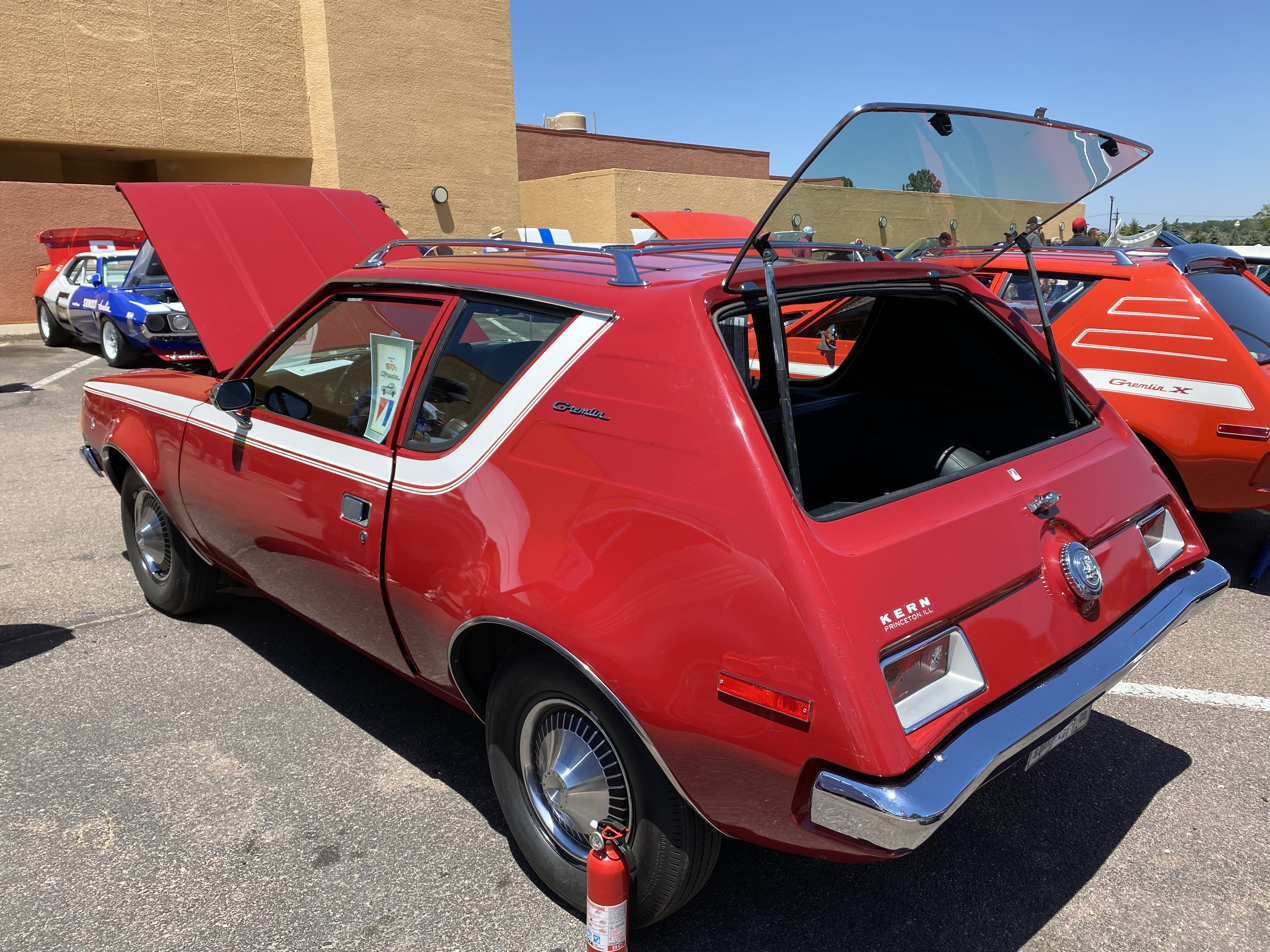
1970 AMC Gremlin with glass hatch open

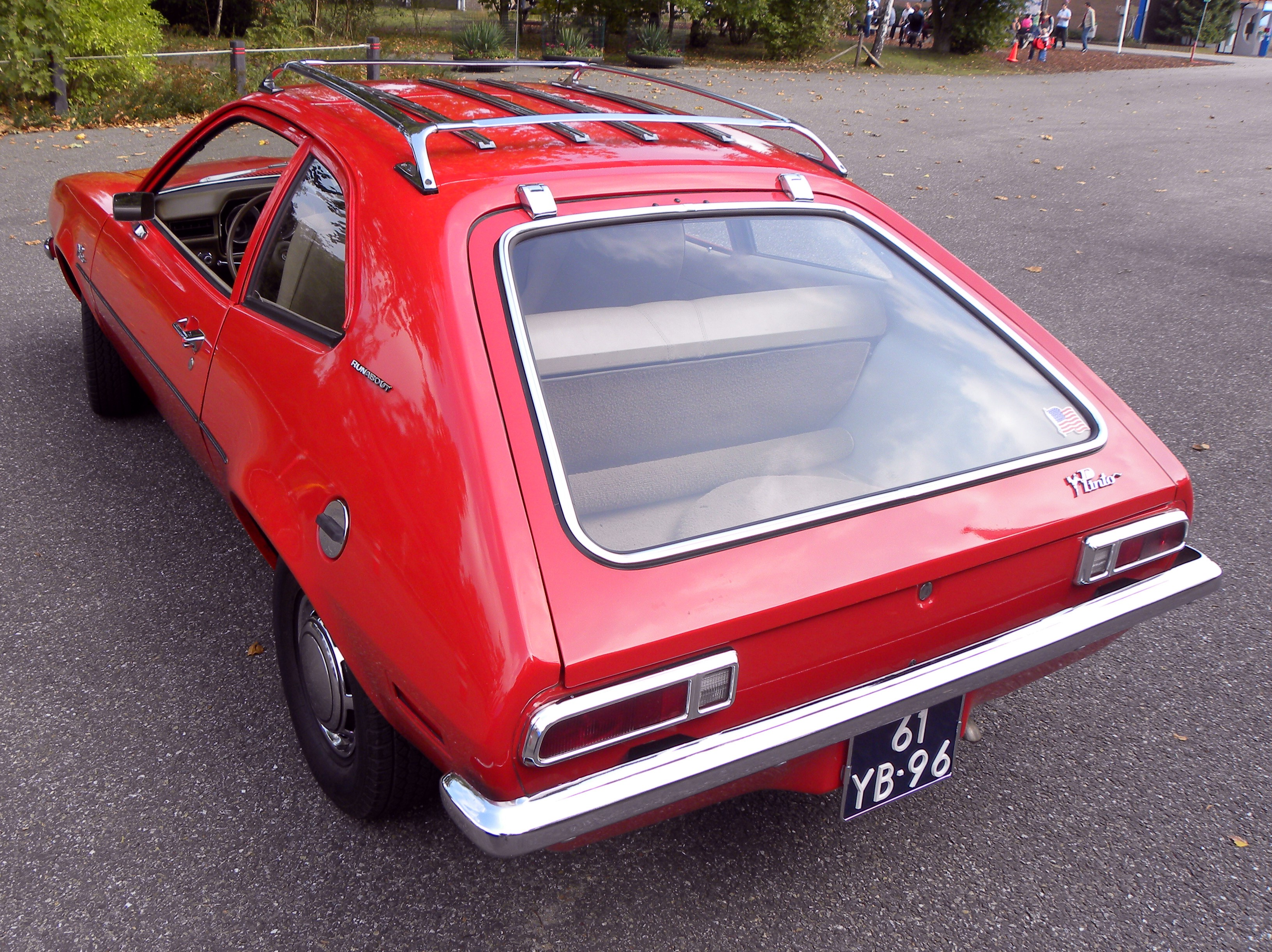
1971 Ford Pinto Runabout

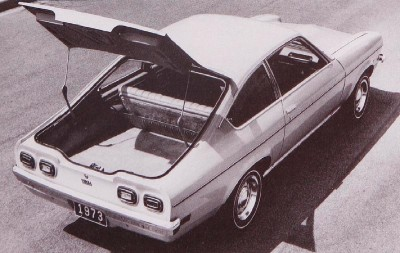
1973 Chevrolet Vega

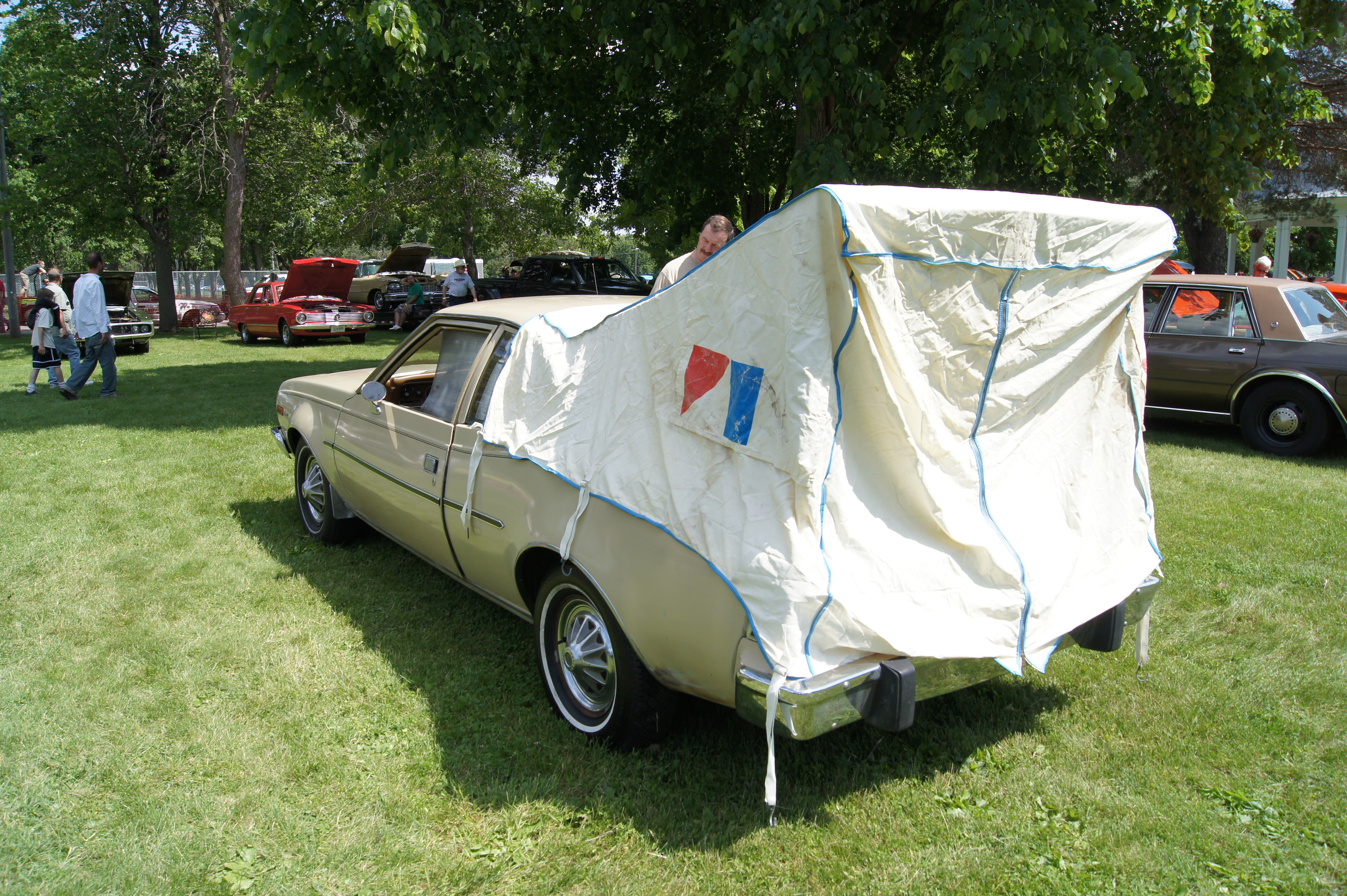
1974 AMC Hornet hatchback with factory mini-camper accessory

In 1970, American Motors Corporation (AMC) released the first North American subcompact car since the 1953-1961 Nash Metropolitan, the AMC Gremlin. Although the Gremlin has the appearance of a hatchback, it is frequently called a Kammback coupe instead, with only its rear window being an upwards opening hatch, that gives access to the rear cargo space. The Gremlin was based on the AMC Hornet, but its abrupt hatchback rear end cut the car's overall length from 179 to 161 inches (4,500 to 4,100 mm). AMC added a hatchback version to its larger compact-sized Hornet line for the 1973 model year. The design and fold-down rear seat more than doubled cargo space and the Hornet was claimed to be the "first compact hatchback" manufactured by U.S. automaker. The 1975 Pacer featured a rear door or hatchback. A longer model with a wagon-type configuration was added in 1977 with its large rear "hatch" as one of the car's three doors, all having different sizes. The 1979 AMC Spirit was available in two designs, a "sedan" with a rear lift up window and a semi-fastback "liftback" version.

General Motors' first hatchback model was the Chevrolet Vega, introduced in September 1970. Over a million Vega hatchbacks were produced for the 1971–1977 model years, accounting for about half of the Vega's total production. The Vega hatchback was also rebadged and sold as the 1973–1977 Pontiac Astre, 1978 Chevrolet Monza S, 1975–1980 Buick Skyhawk, 1975–1980 Oldsmobile Starfire, and 1977–1980 Pontiac Sunbird.

In 1974, the larger Chevrolet Nova became available in a hatchback body style. The Nova hatchback was also rebadged as the Chevrolet Concours, Pontiac Ventura, Pontiac Phoenix, Oldsmobile Omega, Buick Apollo, and Buick Skylark. In 1980, General Motors introduced its first front-wheel-drive hatchback models, the Chevrolet Citation and Pontiac Phoenix.

Both AMC and GM offered a dealer accessory that turned their compact hatchback models into low-cost recreational vehicles. An example is the Mini-Camper Kit for the AMC Hornet, a low-priced canvas tent that converted an open hatchback into a camping compartment with room for sleeping. The "Mini-Camper" was a weatherproof covering that fitted over the roof section from the B-pillar back to the rear bumper that was easy to set up.

Ford Motor Company's first hatchback was the Ford Pinto Runabout, introduced in 1971. The Pinto-based 1974-1978 Ford Mustang II was offered as a hatchback. The body style was carried over to the redesigned Fox platform-based 1979 third generation Mustang and the Mercury Capri derivative. For 1981, Ford offered hatchback versions of its subcompact Escort and the badge-engineered Mercury Lynx, which were now front-wheel drive. Two-seat hatchback derivatives were introduced for 1982, the Ford EXP and the Mercury LN-7.

Chrysler Corporation's first hatchbacks (and first front-wheel drive cars) were the 1978 Dodge Omni / Plymouth Horizon models, which were based on the French Simca-Talbot Horizon. These were followed by the 3-door hatchback Dodge Omni 024 / Plymouth Horizon TC3, which were later renamed Dodge Charger and Plymouth Turismo.

=== Japan ===
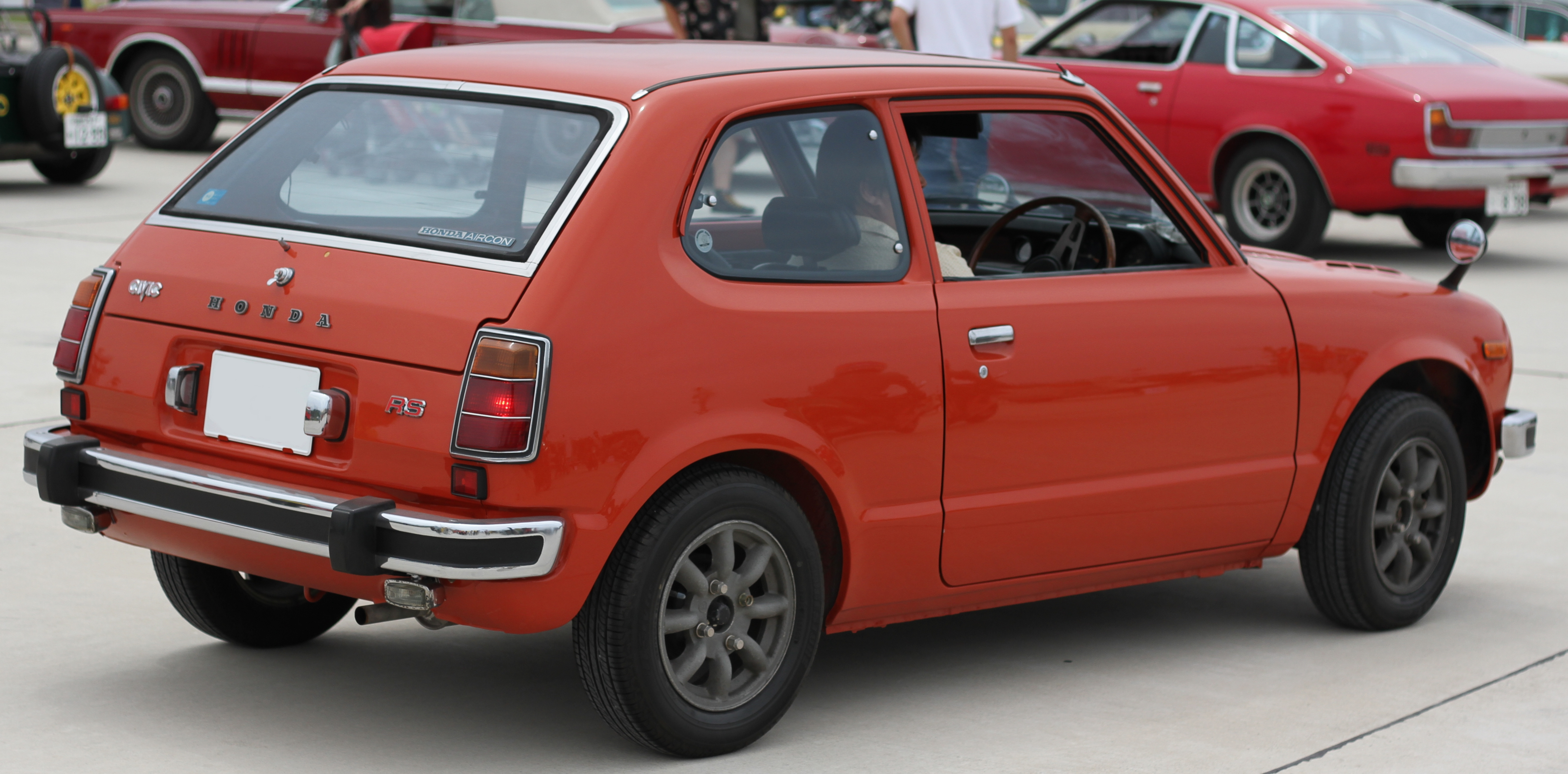
1974-1975 Honda Civic RS

The first Japanese hatchbacks were the 1972 Honda Civic, Nissan Sunny, and Nissan Cherry. The Civic and Cherry had front-wheel drive powertrains, which later became the common configuration for a hatchback. Along with the Honda Civic, other Japanese hatchback models included the Nissan Pulsar, Toyota Corolla, and Suzuki Swift.

Almost all Japanese Kei cars ("city cars") use a hatchback body style, to maximize cargo capacity given the overall vehicle size is limited by the regulations applicable to these vehicles. Kei cars include the Mitsubishi Minica, Honda Life, Suzuki Fronte, Subaru Vivio, and Daihatsu Mira.

=== USSR ===
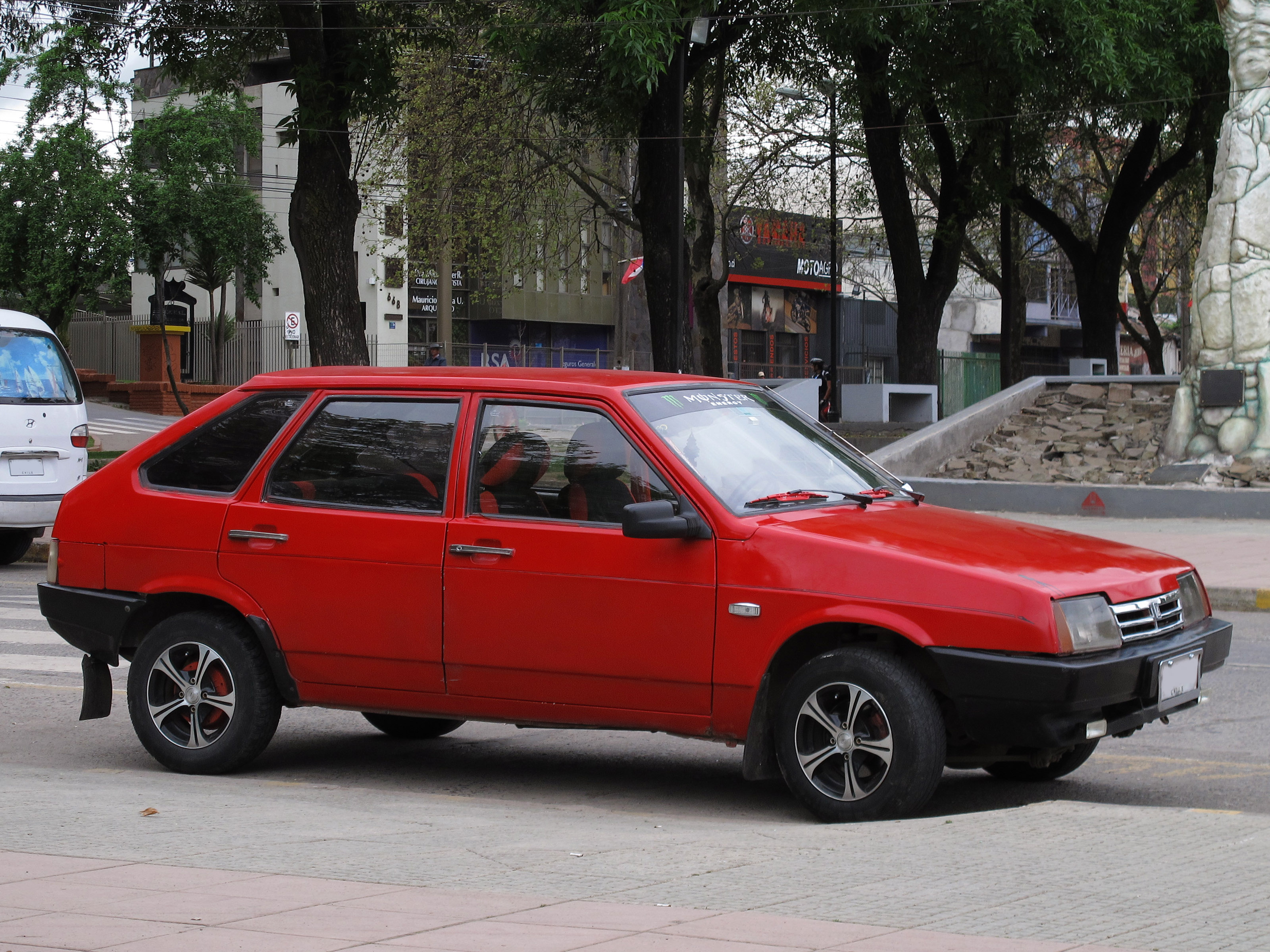
Lada Samara 1500

The first Soviet hatchback was the rear-wheel drive IZh 2125 Kombi, which entered production in 1973. This was followed only in the 1980s by the front-wheel drive Lada Samara in 1984, the Moskvitch 2141/Aleko in 1986, and ZAZ Tavria in 1987.

=== Brazil ===
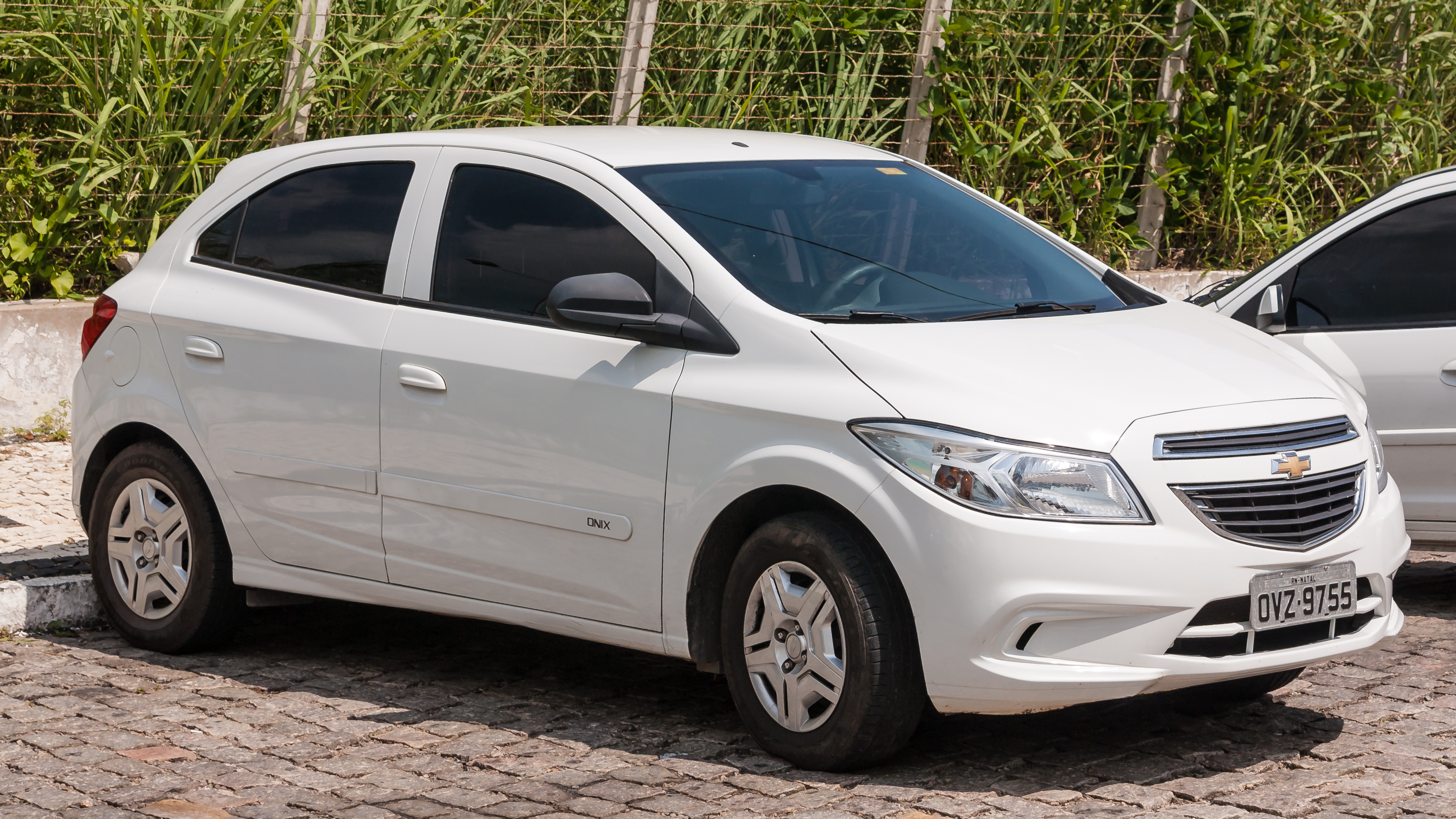
Chevrolet Onix

In 2014, four of the top five selling models in Brazil were hatchbacks. However, in the 1980s and 1990s, hatchbacks were less popular than sedans, leading manufacturers to develop subcompact sedan models for the Brazilian market, for example, the Fiat Premio and sedan versions of the Opel Corsa and Ford Fiesta.

=== India ===
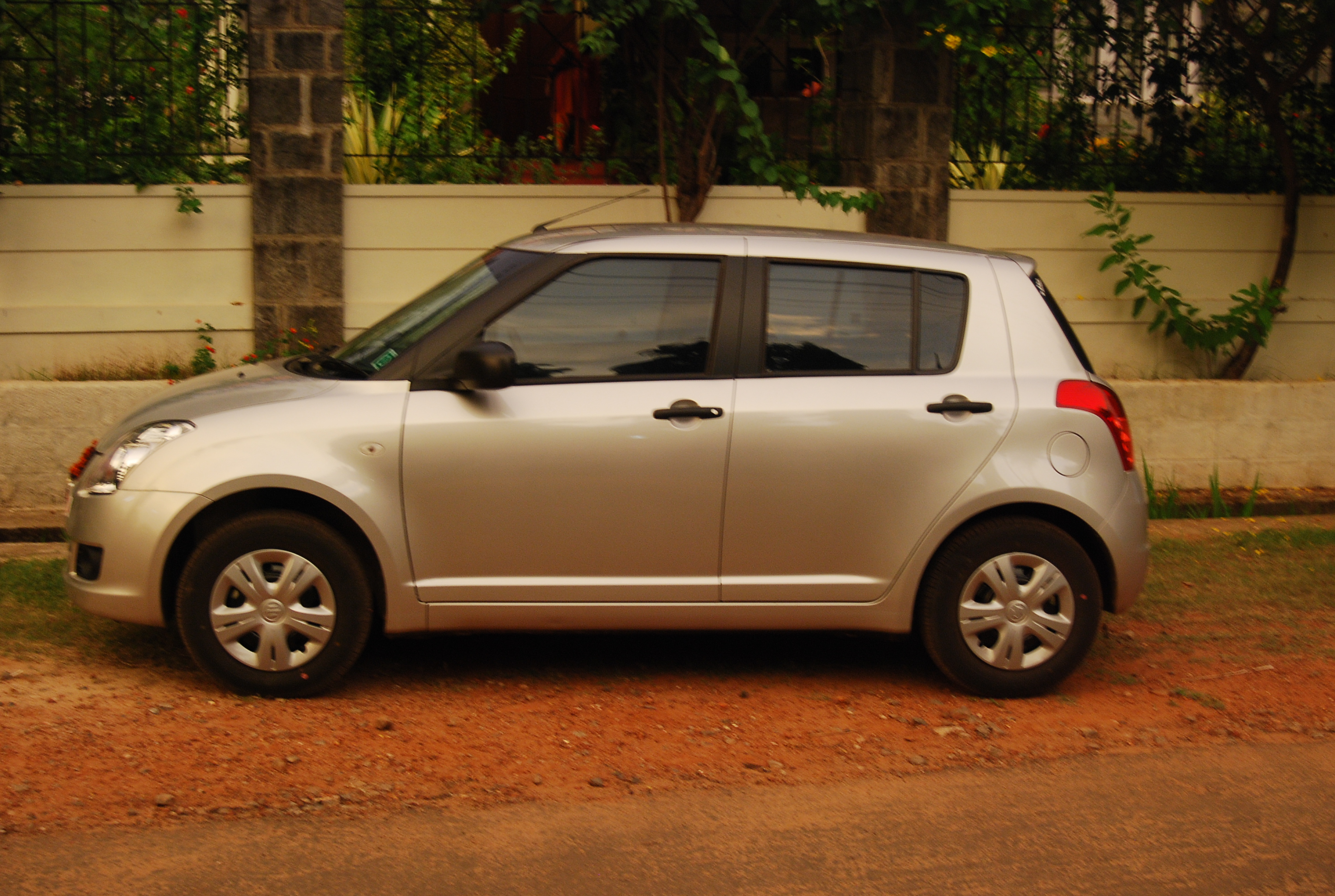
Maruti Swift hatchback in India

The vehicle is classified as a B-segment marque in the European single market, a segment referred to as a supermini in the British Isles. Prior to this, the "Swift" nameplate had been applied to the rebadged Suzuki Cultus in numerous export markets since 1984 and for the Japanese-market Suzuki Ignis since 2000. The Swift became its own model in 2004. Currently, the Swift is positioned between Ignis and Baleno in Suzuki's global lineup

=== Australia ===
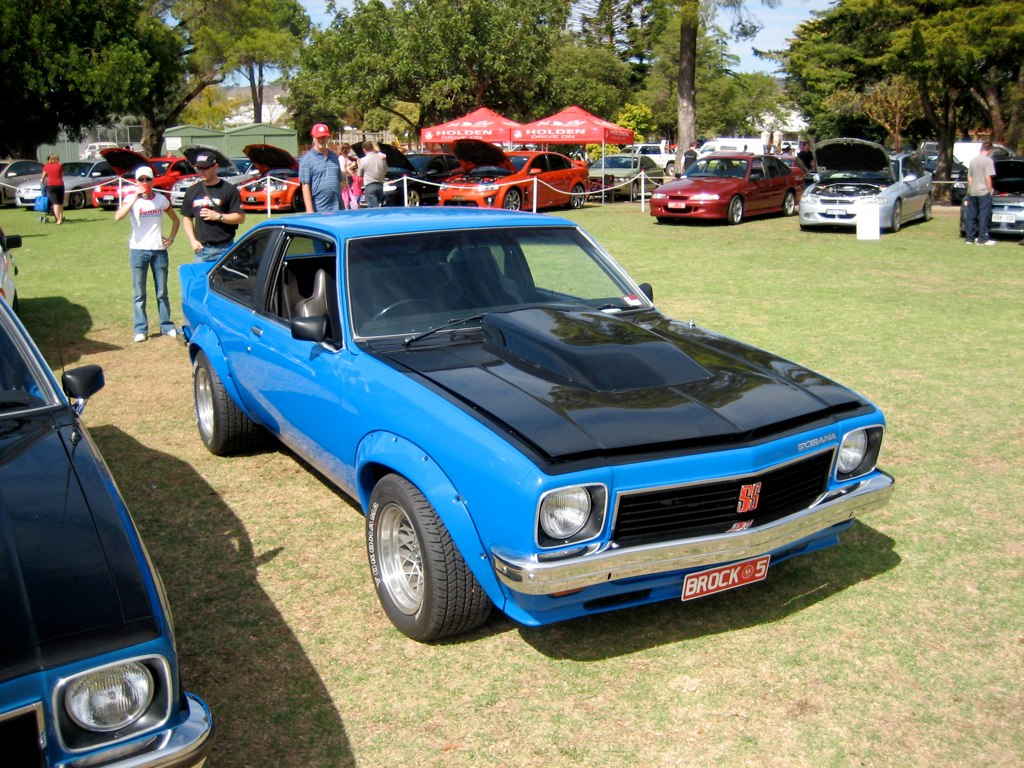
Holden Torana SS (LX) hatchback

Holden produced the Torana Hatchback from 1976 to 1980 across the LX and UC generations. Up until recent years, buyers in Australia have preferred the station wagon body style, with the big three Australian manufacturers; Holden, Ford Australia, and Chrysler Australia all producing station wagon models of their sedan models. Australia started moving to hatchbacks partially in the mid-1990s with relatively cheap offerings from Hyundai and Honda. Australia now sells mostly hatchbacks, after the last domestic-built wagon, the Holden Commodore Sportwagon ceased production in October 2017.

The Ford Laser hatchback was produced in Australia. Nissan produced the Pulsar and Pintara hatchbacks and Mitsubishi built the Colt hatch. Toyota produced the Corolla hatchback, and more recently Holden produced the Cruze Hatchback.

== See also ==
- Trunk (car)
- Hot hatch
- Fastback
- Shooting brake
