= Family car =

Automobile classification

A family car is a car classification used in Europe to describe normally-sized cars. The name comes from the marketed use of these cars to carry a whole family, locally or on vacations. Most family cars are hatchbacks or sedans, although there are MPVs, estates and cabriolets with the same structure as with the other body style. The term covers two types of family cars.

== See also ==
- Car classification
- Vehicle size class
