= Namco (automobiles) =

Greek automobile manufacturer

NAMCO
- Type: Corporation
- Industry: Automotive
- Founded: 1972
- Founder: Gerasimos Kontogouris; Petros-Tzanetos Kontogouris; Kostas Kontogouris; Victor Kontogouris
- Headquarters: Thessaloniki, Greece
- Products: Automobiles
- Website: namco.gr

NAMCO (National Motor Company of Greece) is a Greek vehicle manufacturer. It was founded in 1972 by the Kontogouris brothers.

== History ==
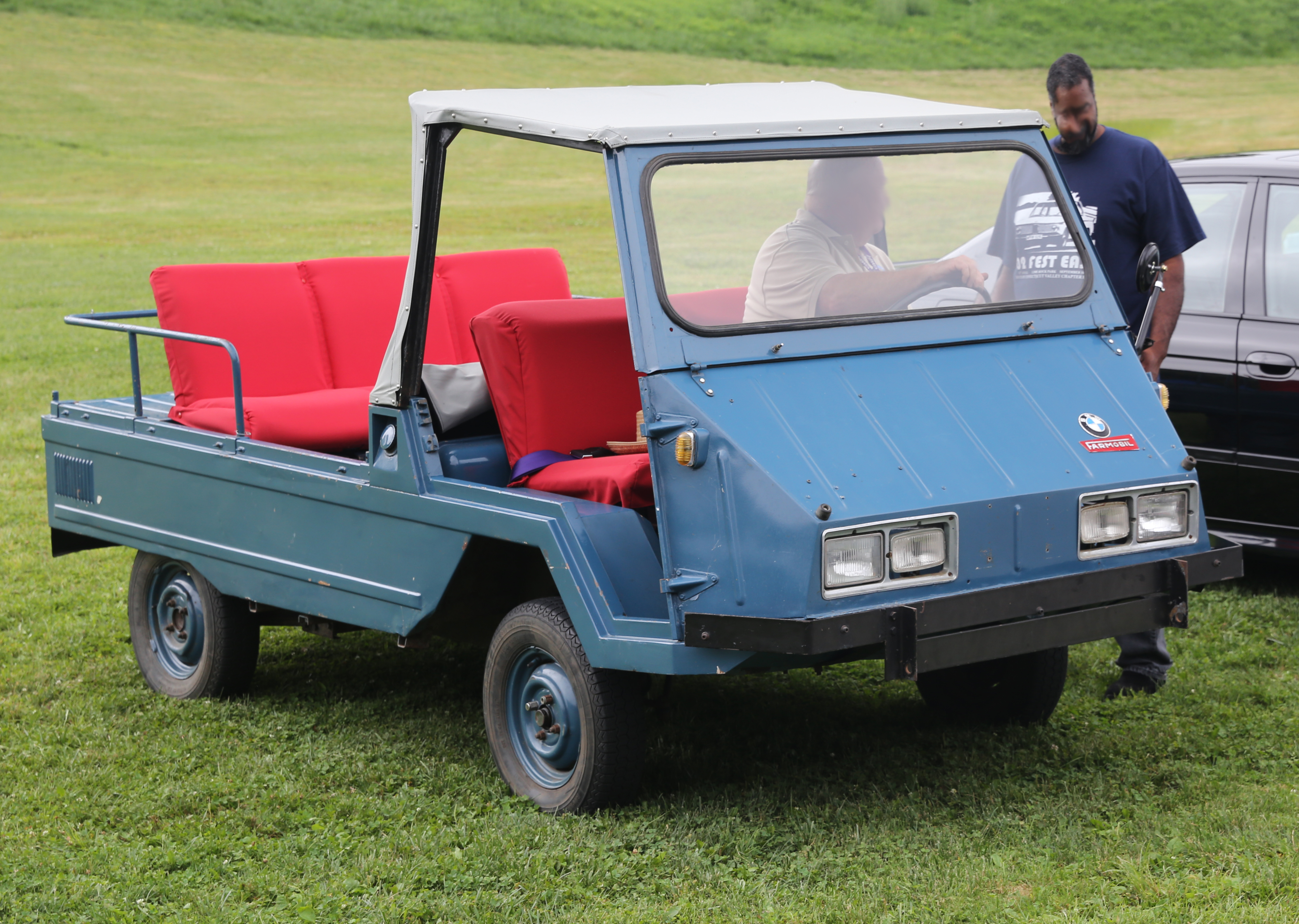
1965 Farmobil 700

The first efforts of the Kontogouris brothers involved attempts to build a light truck called Hellas in Germany. In 1957, they acquired rights to the production technology of a multi-purpose vehicle developed by Swiss engineer Dr. Wilfried Fahr. In 1961, Kontogouris (Gerasimos, Dimitrios, Leonidas, Petros, Victor-Georgios, and Konstantinos) created their first company (FARCO) in Thessaloniki, Greece, in order to produce a vehicle with a BMW 700 flat-2 engine, that they named the FARMOBIL. Ironically, this vehicle was not certified for sale in the Greek market, and nearly all of the vehicles made were exported to several countries around the world. In 1963, the company was acquired by Chrysler and renamed as Chrysler Hellas S.A. - By 1965 (other sources state 1966), Chrysler was planning to produce a version of the Greek vehicle in the United Kingdom via the Rootes company, in which they had acquired a 30% stake in 1964. One prototype was built with a Hillman Imp engine but the vehicle was not put into production. In 1967, production of the FARMOBIL ended and Chrysler Hellas S.A. focused on importing vehicles from Chrysler's American and European subsidiaries. Despite all this, Chrysler retained the relationship with the Kontogouris brothers until the late 1970s. Meanwhile, in 1961 ambitious plans were made by the Kontogouris brothers for a new company (to be called NAMCO) with a new factory in Patras, Greece to produce under licence a German-designed (Neckar) three-wheeler truck and other vehicles, but were not materialized.

=== NAMCO (1972) ===
NAMCO would resurface in 1972, when a light passenger-utility vehicle called the Pony was introduced in the Thessaloniki International Fair, after an agreement was signed with Citroën. The car, whose original design (Baby-Brousse) was created by a team of French engineers in Côte d'Ivoire on a 2CV platform, had been adopted by Citroën itself as part of "basic world car" project that eventually led to the Citroën FAF (the Pony and other similar cars preceded the FAF and were not derived from it, as is often erroneously reported). Indeed, cars on the same basis were produced around the world from Vietnam to Portugal, but the Pony became by far the most successful. In 1974, NAMCO started business officially and production started in a new plant in Thessaloniki. The Pony (also called Pony-Citroën), helped by a law giving tax breaks for light utility-passenger vehicles, became an instant success, being the cheapest car in the market and, at the same time, an incredibly robust and practical automobile; about half a dozen Greek companies would follow NAMCO's example, with similar contraptions, none of which, though, came close to Pony's success. The car was greatly modernized (including Dyane 6 components) and a large number of versions and facelifts followed, keeping it up to standards. A production number of 30,000 Pony's has often been cited, but it most probably included similar vehicles produced in other countries; a more accurate number of cars produced in Greece should be close to 17,000 units. Following its success in the Greek market, the company made significant exports to many countries around the world (a few were even exported to the U.S.), undoubtedly "helped" by the Citroën logo on the vehicle.

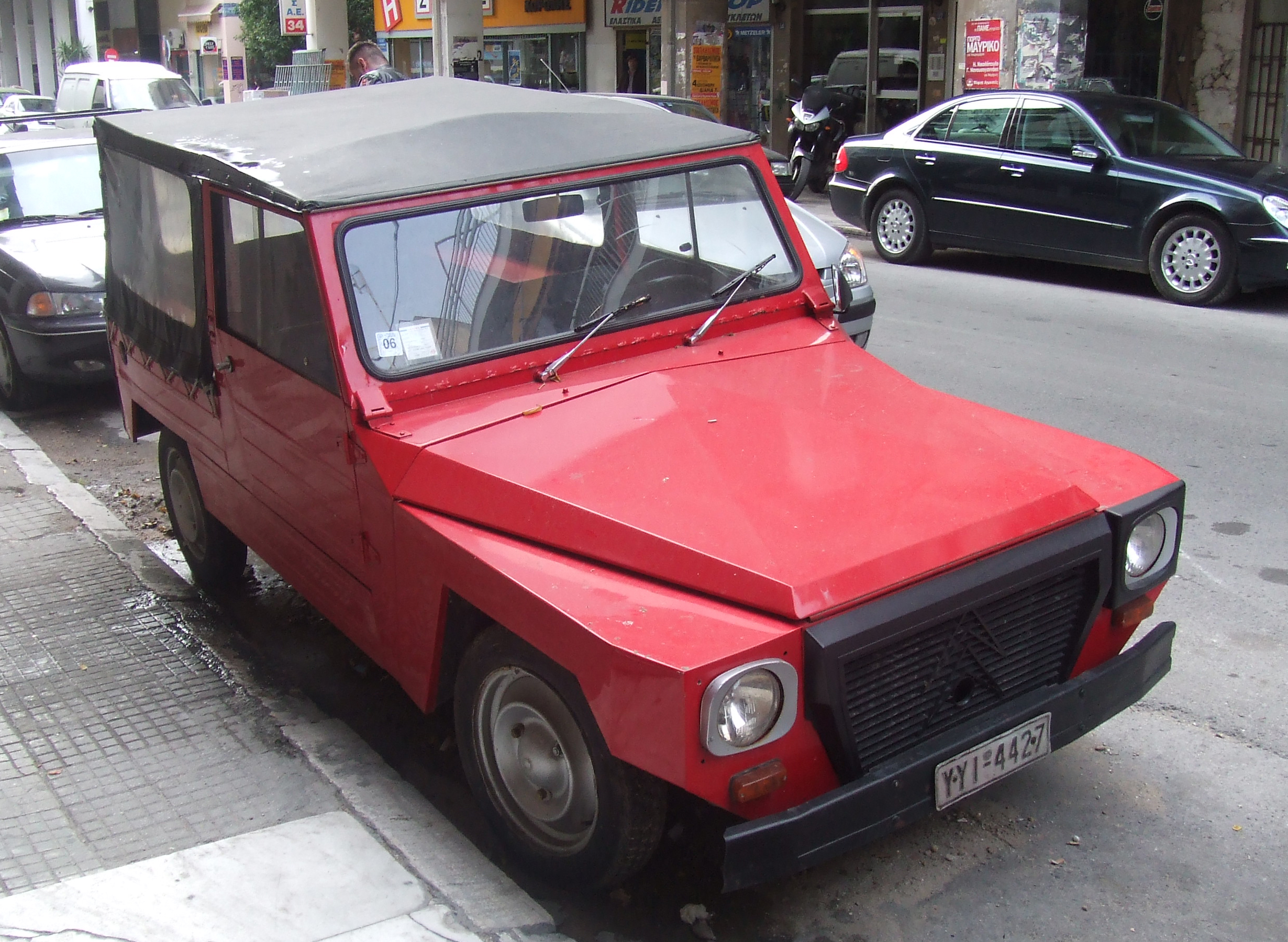
NAMCO Pony-Citroën (1975 model)

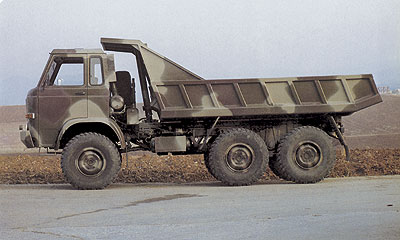
NAMCO Milicar 6x6 (1978)

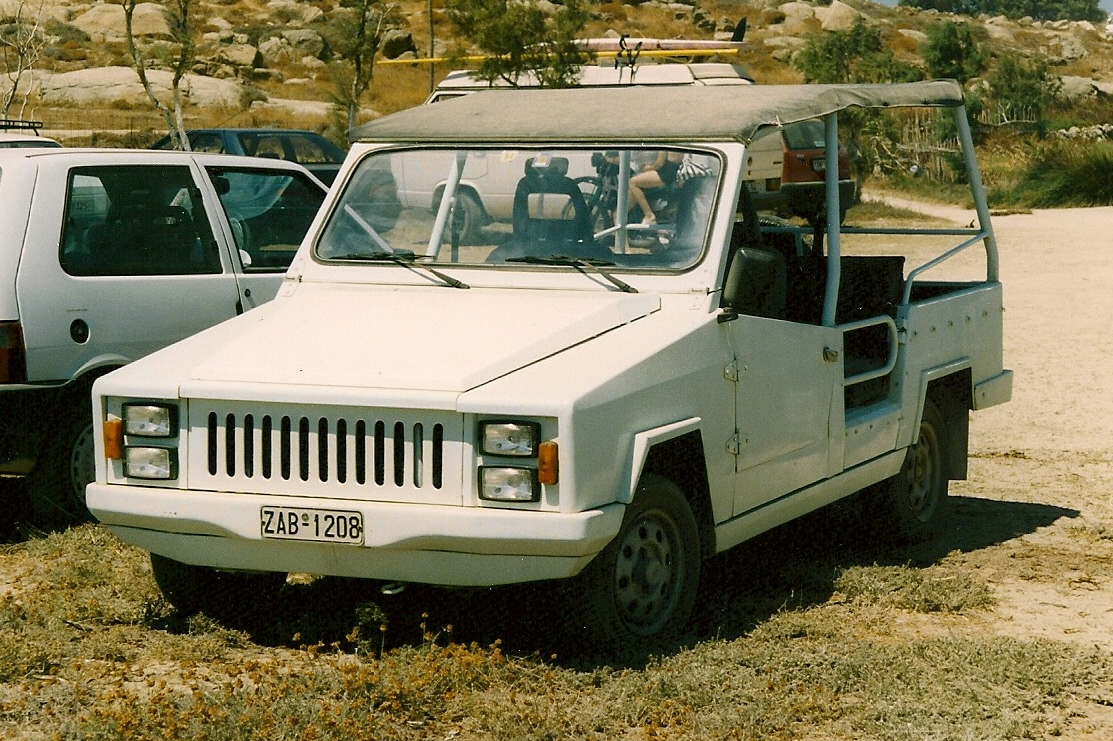
Namco Pony Super (4-door, 1986 model)

In 1978, NAMCO decided to move into other fields, introducing a series of very advanced 4x4 and 6x6 (3 to 6.5 tonne) multi-purpose trucks featuring a novel Swiss-designed, patented axle/suspension system. A complete lineup was made for many uses, consisting of the Agricar, Milicar, Pyrcar and Multi-trac vehicles. It is somewhat of a mystery why those advanced vehicles had limited success, with only small numbers ordered by Greek state authorities. Similarly, NAMCO designed a number of military vehicles including the Panther (of which only 2 were produced), as well as the Tiger and Aquilles armored vehicles and 4x4's, some of which did not even reach the stage of complete prototype. It has been argued that it was simply the wrong time, since the Greek state favored a state company (ELBO) for its supplies in that period.

The first generation Pony (Pony-Citroën) was produced until 1983; in the meanwhile, the law concerning taxation of similar vehicles had been modified. Plans to manufacture other cars under license were not realized and for a moment it seemed that NAMCO would once more be out of business. But the company would bounce back, introducing a completely new model, the Pony Super, introduced in 1985. The second generation Pony had no connection with Citroën technology and was a much more modern car with Ford engines, coming in a number of versions (950 cc 45 hp (34 kW), 1100 cc 55 hp (41 kW), 1300 cc 69 hp (51 kW) and 1600 cc 54 hp (40 kW) diesel, in two- and four-door arrangements). It was essentially developed by NAMCO, since Inthelco, a German company also involved in its development, was majority-owned by NAMCO at the time. An ambitious plan was made to export the car to the U.S. with a 1900 cc engine via Inthelco as the Desta at a rate of 20,000 per year. However, the costs and prospects proved to be grossly miscalculated and the plan was abandoned. No matter how improved the new Pony was, it was still a far cry from the needs of the contemporary Greek market made of progressively more affluent and demanding consumers. Only a few hundred Pony Super's were built until 1992.

Once more, though, the company created one more chance for rebirth, as its founders were stubbornly attached to the car-making business. So, although they also diversified into imports and trade of vehicles keeping NAMCO alive, they transformed the company into a technology exporter, offering design and construction of vehicle producing miniplants (as an antidote, they argued, to the giant conglomerates created by globalism) together with the Pony and their 4x4 truck technology. In 1994, the first Pony Supers produced under license in Bulgaria came out of the assembly plant in that country.

NAMCO is still alive today, although a shadow of its former self. Production of the Pony Super and the trucks never "officially" ended, as the company maintains a factory able to resume production. Actually, a "third-generation" Pony (in reality a Pony Super with minor improvements) was introduced in 2003 but never produced. Company focus, nonetheless, as was the case with many similar Greek companies, has decisively shifted towards trade and services.

== New era ==
The company had announced plans to restart production in 2015, introducing a "new generation Pony". The new Pony was to be powered either by a PCM (Peugeot-Citroën Moteurs) or FIAT (1360 cc) engine, and retained the main body design of the previous generation Pony. The company had made several announcements, including claims about discussions with companies in Asia, Africa, and South America who had expressed interest in license production of the new model. However, none of the above has been materialized to date.

== Models ==
=== Company: Farco ===
- Farmobil advanced multi-purpose vehicle (designed by Dr. W. Fahr), 1961-1967.

=== Company: NAMCO (initial planned establishment) ===
- Three-wheeler truck, (Neckar licence), 1961: production planned to have started by mid-1960s but not materialized.

=== Company: NAMCO (proper operation) ===
- Pony-Citroën light passenger-utility automobile (Citroën licence), 1974-1983: produced in a large number of variants and several facelifts and improvements.
- Agricar agricultural 4x4 and 6x6 truck, 1978-(theoretically to date).
- Milicar military 4x4 and 6x6 truck based on the Agricar, 1978-(theoretically to date).
- Pyrcar 4x4 fire-fighting vehicle based on the Agricar, 1978-(theoretically to date).
- Multi-Trac, 4x4 multi-purpose vehicle based on the Agricar, 1978-(theoretically to date).
- Panther light military 4x4 vehicle, introduced 1980 (similar to the French Lohr Fardier but actually a different design): only 2 were produced.
- Tiger 4x4 armored wheeled military vehicle, proposed 1982: designed, but prototype not completed.
- Aquilles armoured wheeled fighting vehicle, based on the Milicar, proposed 1982: design not completed.
- 4x4 jeep-type military vehicle, proposed 1985: design not completed.
- Licence built variant of Daihatsu Wildcat, proposed 1985: not built.
- Pony Super series, completely redesigned passenger-utility automobile, 1985-(theoretically to date): built in a large number of variants and models with different engines.

== Related entry ==
- Citroën FAF
