= DeLorean Motor Company =

Defunct American automobile manufacturer (1975–1982)

- Industry: Automotive
- Founded: October 24, 1975; 50 years ago
- Founder: John DeLorean
- Defunct: October 26, 1982; 43 years ago
- Headquarters: Detroit, Michigan, U.S.
- Key people: John DeLorean, Bill Collins, Mike Loasby, Mike Kimberley, C.R. "Dick" Brown, Bruce McWilliams
- Products: DMC DeLorean
- Production output: 9000 (estimated)

The DeLorean Motor Company (DMC) was an American automobile manufacturer formed by automobile industry executive John DeLorean in 1975. It produced just one model, from early 1981 to late 1982—the stainless steel DeLorean sports car featuring gull-wing doors. Its history was brief and turbulent, ending in receivership and bankruptcy in 1982. In October 1982, John DeLorean was videotaped in a sting operation agreeing to bankroll drug trafficking, but was acquitted at the subsequent trial on the basis of entrapment.

The DeLorean was featured in the Back to the Future film trilogy (1985, 1989, and 1990) as the car made into a time machine, although the company had closed before the first film was made.

In 1995, Liverpool-born mechanic Stephen Wynne founded the DeLorean Motor Company (Texas), an entirely new company not related to the original, located in Humble, Texas, and shortly thereafter acquired the remaining parts inventory, and registered his own stylized version of the "DMC" logo.

== History ==
=== Beginning ===
John DeLorean founded the DeLorean Motor Company in Detroit, Michigan, on October 24, 1975. He was already well known in the automobile industry as a capable engineer, business innovator, and youngest person to become a General Motors executive. Investment capital came primarily in the form of business loans from Bank of America and from the formation of partnerships and private investment from select parties, including The Tonight Show host Johnny Carson and entertainers Roy Clark and Sammy Davis Jr. Capital was also raised through a dealer investment program in which dealerships offering DeLorean's cars for sale were made shareholders in the company.

DeLorean also sought lucrative incentives from governments and economic organizations to pay for manufacturing facilities by looking to build his first factory in an area of particularly high unemployment. Initially considering Ireland, he proposed using a site in Limerick, but the Republic's then Minister for Industry and Commerce, Desmond O'Malley, decided not to support the project, later describing it as "all too good to be true". A deal in Puerto Rico was about to be agreed when DeLorean took up an offer from the Industrial Development Board for Northern Ireland. Besides some early seed capital from Hollywood stars, the DeLorean Motor Company relied on the British Government for about $120 million of its $200 million startup costs according to The Times. The British Government was keen to create jobs in Northern Ireland to reduce sectarian violence. DeLorean was under the impression that the British Government, as part of this offer, would provide his company with Export Credit financing. This would provide a loan of 80% of the wholesale cost of the vehicles (US$20,000) upon completion and delivery for shipping.

=== Manufacturing facility ===
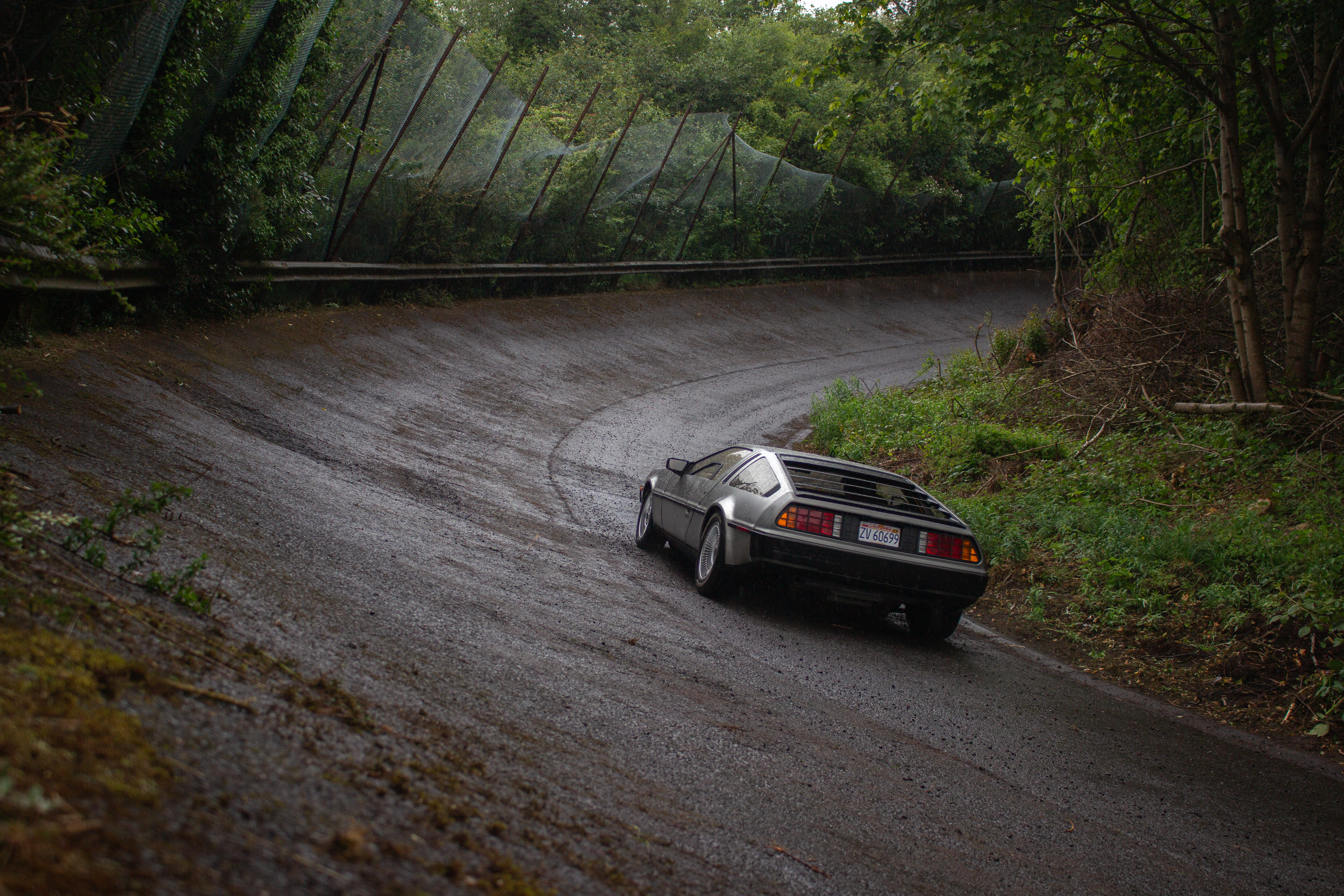
A DeLorean car on the test track at the Dunmurry factory as part of the DeLorean Revival event, June 2024.

In October 1978, construction of the six-building, 660,000 sq ft (61,000 m^{2}) manufacturing plant began in Northern Ireland. It was designed and managed by Gerald Mooney, of Brodie & Hawthorn Architects of Belfast, and constructed in 16 months by Farrans, McLaughlin & Harvey. A test/proving track was also constructed next to the factory. Officially known as DMCL (DeLorean Motor Cars, Ltd.), the facility was located in The Cutts in Dunmurry, a suburb on the south-western edge of Belfast.

Unit production was scheduled to begin in 1979, but engineering delays and budget overruns caused the assembly lines to start only in early 1981. Workers at the factory were generally inexperienced; many never had jobs before joining DMC. This may have contributed to the reported quality issues attributed to the early production vehicles and the subsequent establishment of Quality Assurance Centers (QAC) located at various delivery locations. QACs were set up in California, New Jersey and Michigan where some of the quality issues were to be addressed and resolved before delivery to dealerships. Some of the issues related to the fitting of body panels, higher-output alternators, and gull-wing door adjustments.

The combined efforts of quality assurance improvements at the factory and the post-production quality assurance done at the QACs were generally successful, although workmanship complaints still occasionally arose; the 1981 DeLoreans were delivered with a 12-month, 12,000 mi (19,000 km) warranty. By 1982, improvements in components and the more experienced workforce meant that production quality was vastly improved. Disputes between dealerships and customers arose later because many dealerships refused to do warranty work because they were not reimbursed.

=== Downturn and bankruptcy ===
The lack of demand, cost overruns, and unfavorable exchange rates began to take their toll on DMC's cash flow in late 1981. The company had estimated its break-even point to be between 10,000 and 12,000 units, but sales were only around 6,000. In response to the income shortfall, a restructuring plan was devised where a new "DeLorean Motors Holding Company" would be formed, which in turn would have become corporate parent to DMC and each of its subsidiaries: DeLorean Motor Cars Limited (manufacturer), DeLorean Motor Cars of America (distributor in the U.S.) and DeLorean Research Partnership (a research and development company). In January 1982, due to United States Securities and Exchange Commission questions about the company's viability, the company was forced to cancel the stock issue for the holding company that DeLorean had hoped would raise about $27 million.

In March 1982, Bank of America sued Delorean for defaulting on loan payments, and asked for 1,979 DeLorean luxury sports cars in reparation.

John DeLorean lobbied the British Government for aid, but was refused unless he was able to find a matching amount from other investors. What followed is a matter of debate between the British Government, the US Federal Bureau of Investigation (FBI), the Drug Enforcement Administration (DEA), DeLorean, his investors, and the US court system. At some point in 1982, John DeLorean became the target of an FBI sting operation designed to arrest drug traffickers. He was arrested in October 1982 and charged with conspiring to smuggle $24 million worth of cocaine into the US. The key element of evidence for the prosecution was a videotape showing DeLorean discussing the drugs deal with undercover FBI agents Benedict (Ben) Tisa and West, although DeLorean's attorney Howard Weitzman successfully demonstrated to the court that he was coerced into participation in the deal by the agents who initially approached him as legitimate investors. He was acquitted of all charges, but his reputation was forever tarnished. After his trial and subsequent acquittal, DeLorean quipped, "Would you buy a used car from me?"

Hours before his October 1982 arrest, the British government announced it would close DeLorean's production plant.

In the end, sufficient funds could not be raised to keep the company alive. DMC went bankrupt in 1982, taking with it 2,500 jobs and over $100 million in investments. The British Government attempted to revive some usable remnants of the manufacturing facility without success, and the Dunmurry factory was closed. DeLorean himself retired in New Jersey, and the dream with which he had mesmerized Britain's Labour government, of industry rising out of the ashes of The Troubles in Northern Ireland, was shattered. He claimed that the DMCL was deliberately closed for political reasons, and at the time of closing was a solidly viable company with millions of dollars in the bank and two years of dealer orders on the books.

Approximately 9,000 cars were made between January 1981 and December 1982, although actual production figures are unclear and estimates differ. Some of the cars manufactured in 1982, but not shipped to the United States (as the US arm of DMC had no money to 'buy' the cars from the factory in Northern Ireland), with 15XXX and 16XXX Vehicle Identification Numbers are actually 1982 models that were given later VINs, dated 1983, by Consolidated International (now known as Big Lots), a company that had a buyback program with DMC and had bought out the remaining unsold cars and also the inventory of unused parts left in the factory after the bankruptcy.

Folk tales in Ireland attribute the failure of DeLorean to the fact that the company had destroyed a sacred fairy fort to build its factory.

The DeLorean assembly plant was eventually occupied by the French automotive supplier Montupet, which began to manufacture cast aluminum cylinder heads for automobile engines at the Dunmurry facility in 1989. As of Monputet's acquisition in 2015, the factory employed more than 600 people. The facility is currently operated as Montupet UK, a subsidiary of Linamar Corporation. A community of DeLorean enthusiasts reunite on a regular basis on the site's defunct test tracks (which they renovated for low-speed use), bringing along their replica DeLorean models to create a fleet that reached 62 DeLorean vehicles in June 2024.

== Vehicles ==
=== Production vehicles ===
==== DeLorean ====
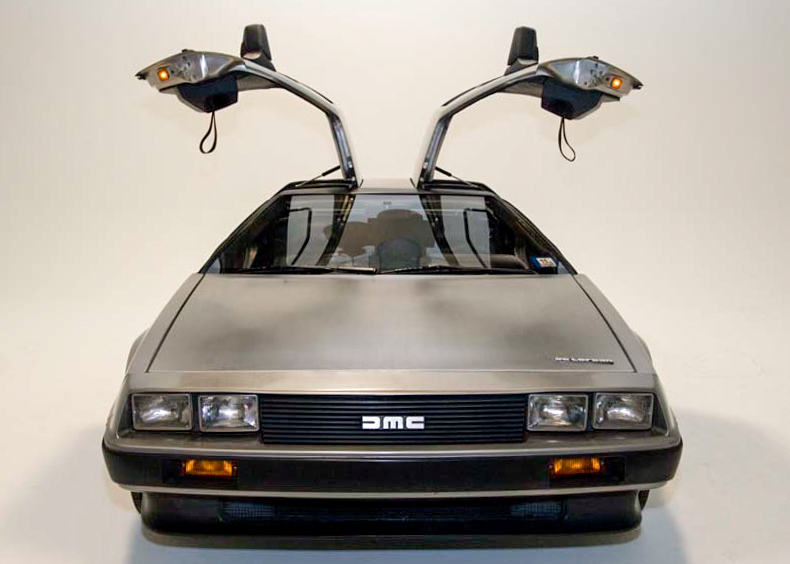
DMC DeLorean with gull-wing doors open

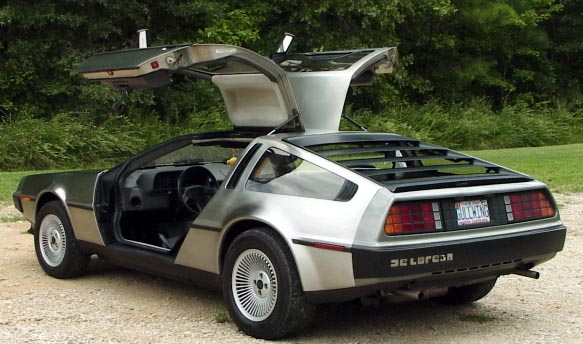
Back left view

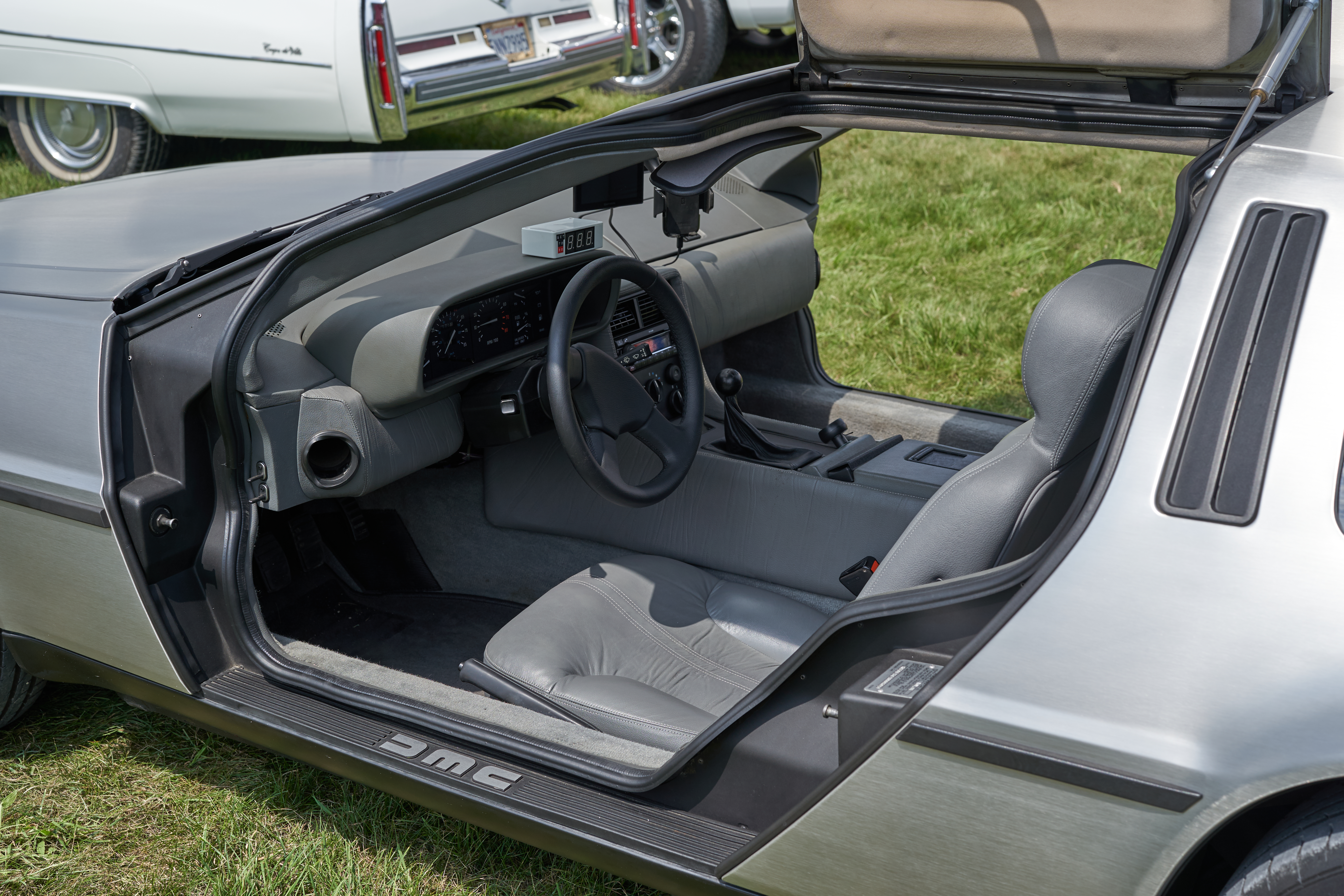
Interior view

The DeLorean (known internally during development within DMC as the DMC-12 (Note: The DMC-12 designation was a pre-production moniker and was not used in official sales or marketing material for the production car.)) was the only car produced by DMC. Reception was mixed. Although the vehicle had a waiting list of prospective buyers prior to its release, the list price of $25,000 (approximately equivalent to $89,000 in 2025) was prohibitive for most of the market—especially for what many considered an under-powered and impractical plaything. "It's not a barn burner," observed Road & Track, "(with) a 0–60 mph time of 10.5 seconds. Frankly, that's not quick for a sports/GT car in this price category." The stainless steel body panels were attractive and impervious to corrosion, but the sheen surface tended to show fingerprints and meant the car could not be easily painted; every DeLorean looked identical. Some dealerships painted their cars to make them distinctive. DMC tested translucent paint for different color options while allowing the stainless steel grain to show through, but no cars were sold with factory painted body panels. The only factory option initially available was automatic transmission. A grey interior was offered later in 1981 as an alternative to the standard black. Accessories such as pinstriping and luggage racks provided further individuality.

A DeLorean was prominently featured in the 1985 film Back to the Future and its two sequels, in which it was converted into a time machine. The DeLorean time machine entered popular culture and played a major role in the continued popularity of the model.

=== Concepts ===
==== DMC-24 ====
The DMC-24 was a proposal for a 4-seater sedan retaining the general shape and gull-wing doors of the DeLorean. Several designs were drafted. One design, a 2-door, had the doors and cabin of the DeLorean stretched to allow rear entry and rear seating. Another design had a separate set of rear doors. The 4-door design was produced as a rolling mock-up by ItalDesign, based on the Lancia Medusa concept car. The bill for the ItalDesign version was unpaid by DMC, and ItalDesign modified it to become the Lamborghini Marco Polo concept car.

==== DMC-44 ====
The DMC-44 was a proposal for a lightweight 4×4 off-road vehicle using the drivetrain and other components from the Polski Fiat 126p. The design is similar to the French Lohr Fardier paratrooper utility vehicle and DeLorean brought one to their headquarters for study. A tubular steel frame prototype was produced, and the company produced a promotional video to attract investors to the project. There would have been two versions; one a dedicated off-roader, the other road legal.

==== DMC-80 ====
The DMC-80 was a proposal for a bus which was mooted in the fall of 1981, with a variety of 6-cylinder engines and transmissions. The company produced a promotional brochure for public transit corporations. The bus would have been an Americanized German low-floor bus produced in the United States.
