= Ford Mondeo =

Car manufactured by the Ford Motor Company since 1993

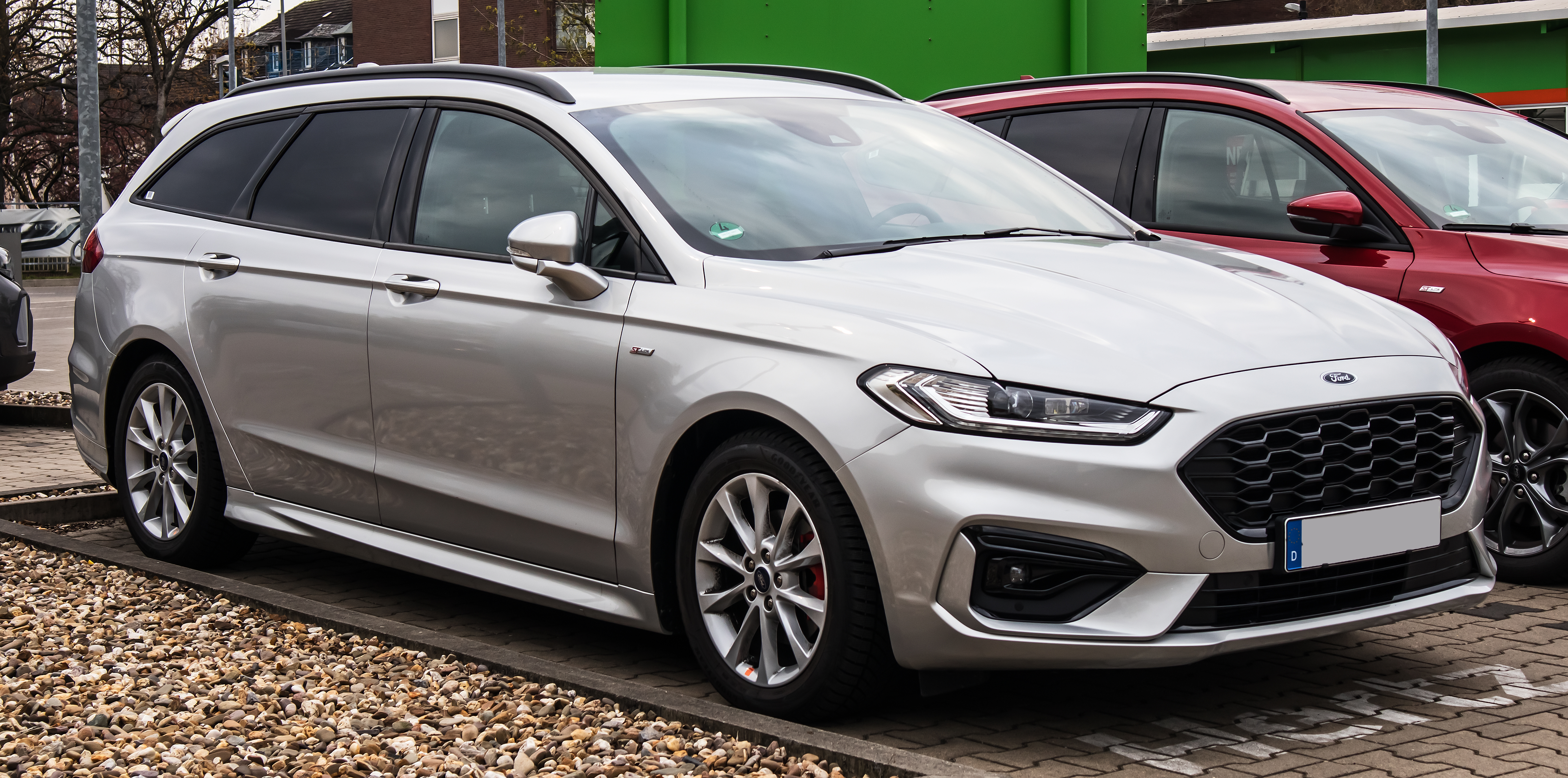
- Fourth generation

Overview
- Manufacturer: Ford
- Also called: Ford Contour (North America, 1994–2000); Mercury Mystique (North America, 1994–2000); Ford Fusion (Americas except Argentina, 2012–2020); Ford Taurus (Middle East, 2022–present)
- Production: 1992– March 2022; 1992–present (China, Middle East); 1995–2000, 2013–2020 (North America)

Body and chassis
- Class: Mid-size/large family car (D) (1992–2022); Full-size car (E) (2022–present)
- Body style: 4-door saloon; 5-door liftback; 5-door estate
- Layout: Front-engine, front-wheel-drive (1993–present); Front-engine, all-wheel-drive (1993–2000, 2007–2022)

Chronology
- Predecessor: Ford Sierra/Ford Scorpio (Europe); Ford Tempo/Mercury Topaz (North America); Ford Telstar (Asia and Australia)

The Ford Mondeo is a mid-size/large family car (D-segment) that was manufactured and marketed by Ford across five generations of models from 1993 to 2022. As a self-declared world car, the Mondeo was intended to consolidate the European Sierra, the Telstar in Asia and Australia, and the Tempo/Mercury Topaz in North America. The first two generations used the CDW27 platform, the third-generation model used the EUCD platform, the fourth-generation used the CD4 platform, and the fifth-generation used the C2 platform.

Ford announced in March 2021 that it would discontinue Mondeo production in Europe and Argentina with no direct successor. Production of the Mondeo ended in Europe in March 2022.

The Mondeo nameplate derives from the Latin word mundus, meaning "world".

== First generation (1992) ==
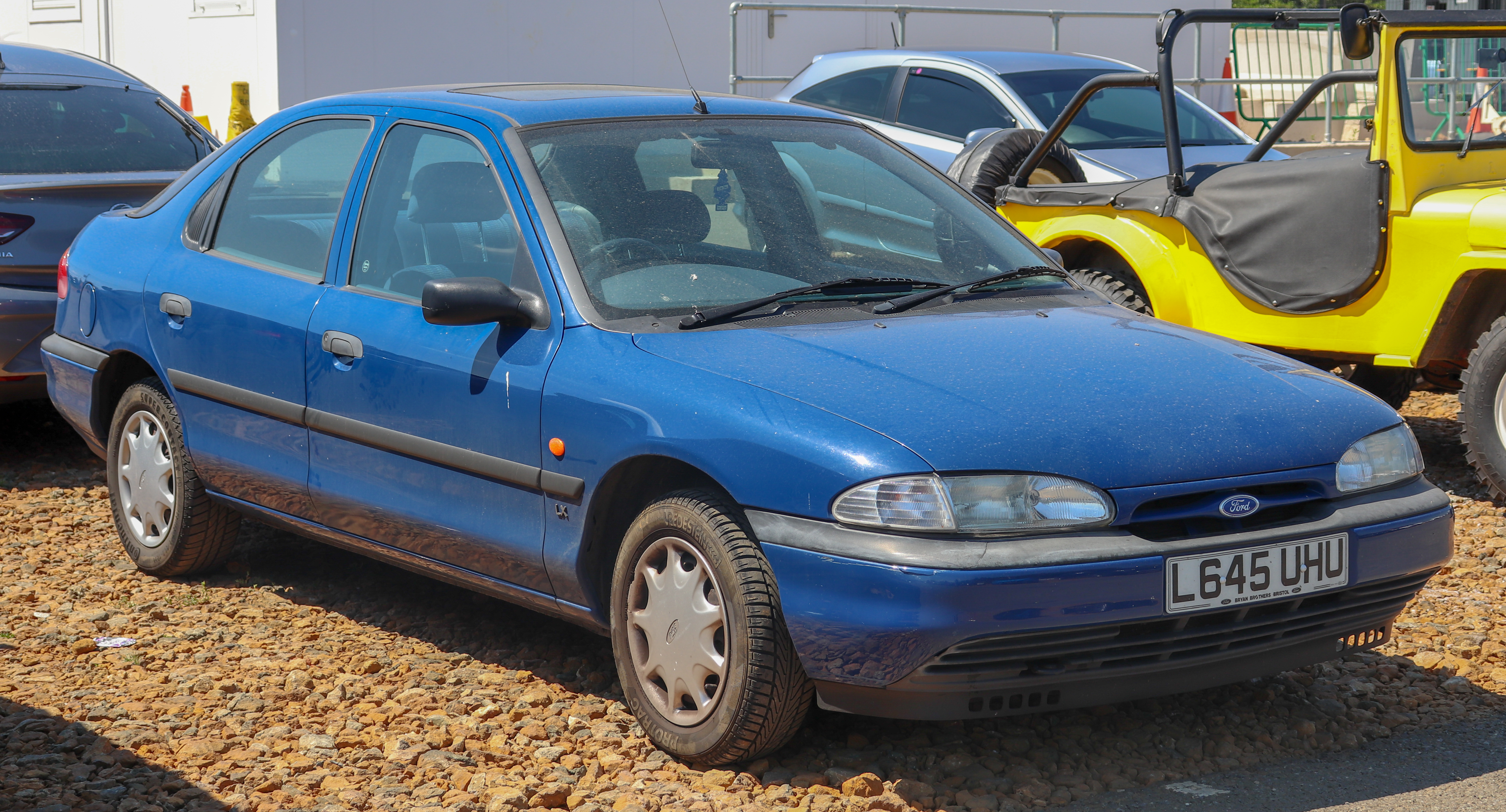

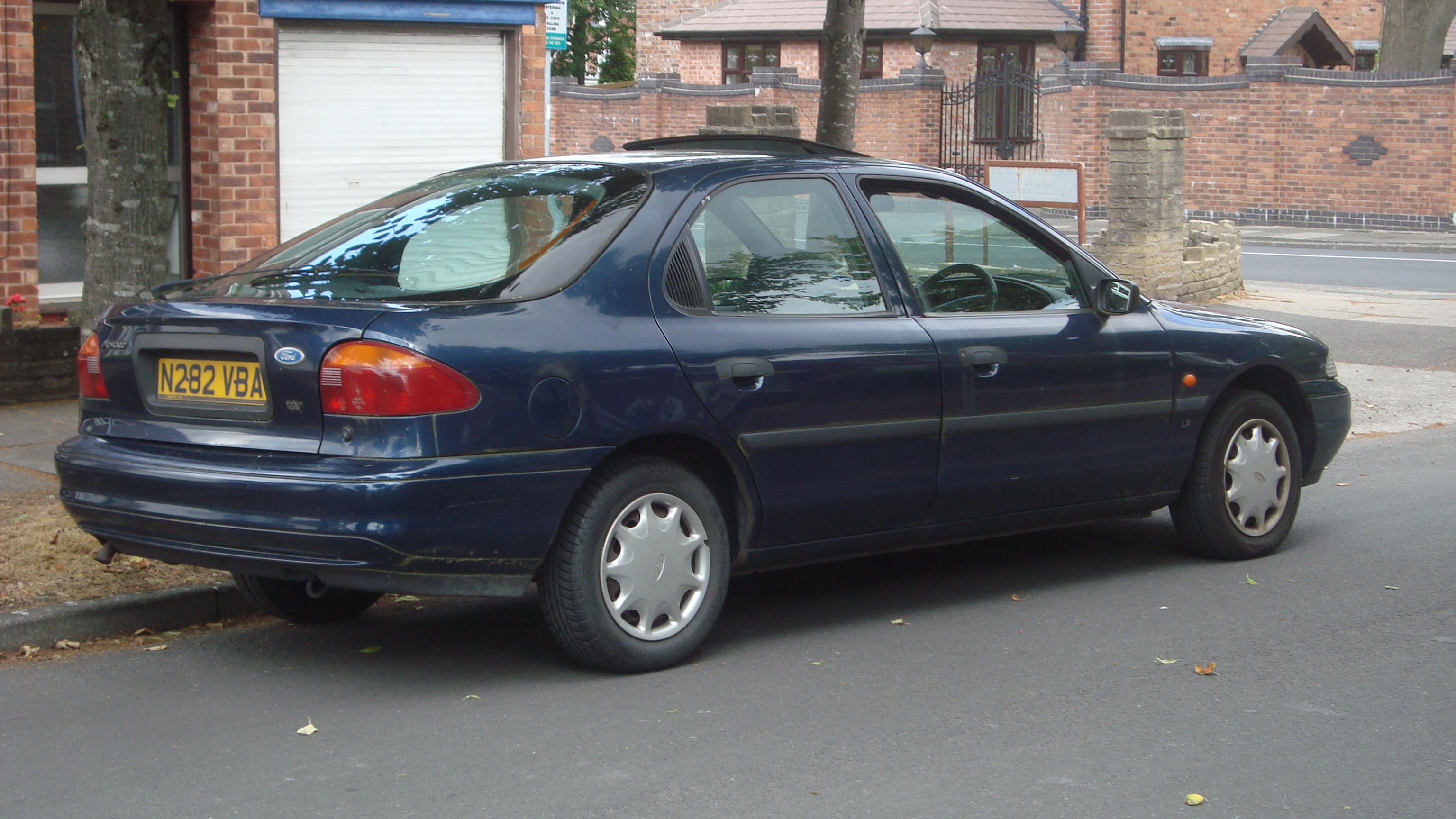
First-generation Mondeo

The first-generation Mondeo was introduced in November 1992, with sales beginning in March 1993. Intended as a world car, the first-generation Mondeo was significant as its design and marketing were shared between Ford USA in Dearborn and Ford of Europe. It replaced the Ford Sierra in Europe, the Ford Telstar in a large portion of Asia and other markets, while it is also sold as the Ford Contour and Mercury Mystique in North America to replace the Ford Tempo and Mercury Topaz. Unlike the Sierra, the Mondeo is front-wheel drive in its most common form, with a rarer four-wheel drive version available on the Mk I car only. Despite being billed as a world car, the only external items the Mondeo shared initially with the Contour built in Kansas City Assembly in Claycomo, Missouri, and Cuautitlán Assembly were the windscreen, front windows, front mirrors and door handles. Three body styles were available, which are saloon, liftback, and estate.

The mid-cycle facelift was launched in October 1996 leaving only the doors, the roof, and the rear quarter panels on the estate the same as the original model. The extensive redesign in 1996 was known as the Mondeo Mk II.

== Second generation (2000) ==
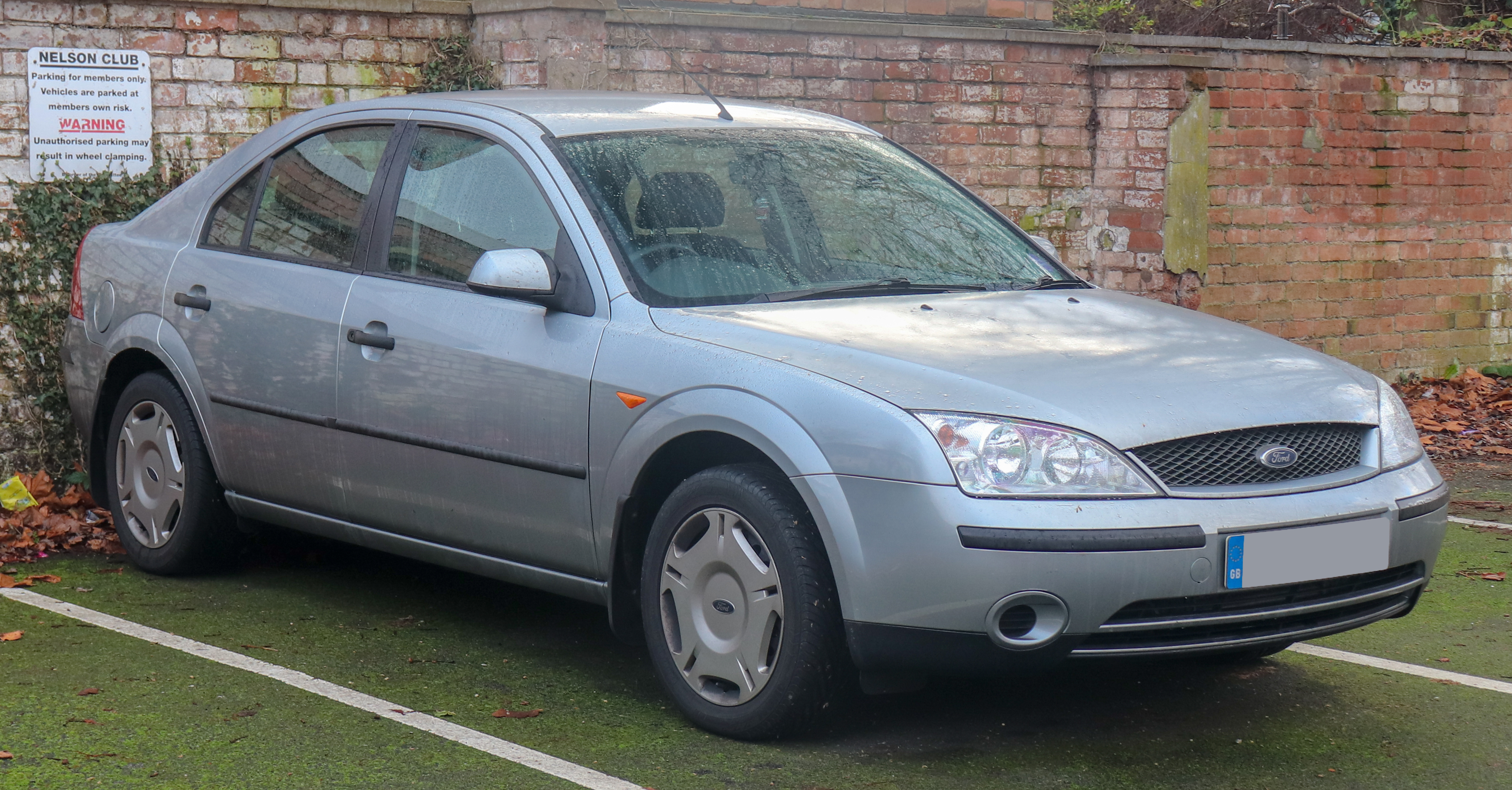

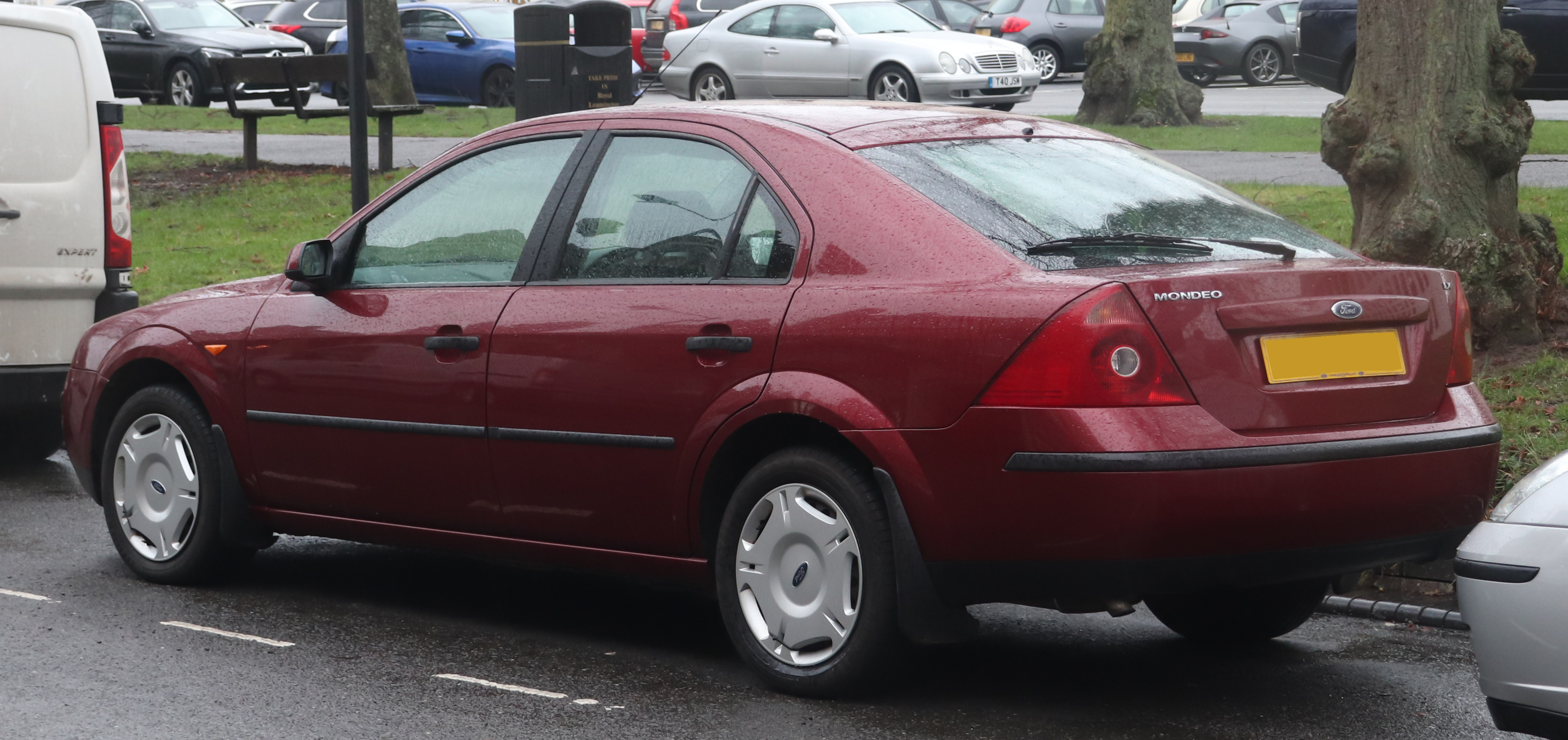
Second-generation Mondeo

The second-generation Mondeo was introduced in October 2000. This Mondeo was considerably larger than its predecessor, while the basic chassis and suspension design was carried over from the previous generation along with the CDW27 platform. Following the standard setting interior of the Volkswagen Passat (B5) in 1996, Ford paid a great deal of attention to the second generation Mondeo's interior and was the first major American manufacturer to react to the new standard set by Volkswagen. Ford abandoned its New Edge design theme for the second generation, opting to take the Prodigy concept car as a design reference. Ford dispensed with the rounded American style interior of the first generation, and developed a more sober 'Germanic' design. Saloon, liftback, and estate body styles were available.

This Mondeo came to Mexico, replacing the North American built Ford Contour, and was sold from 2001 to 2007, when the Ford Fusion replaced it. The second generation Mondeo was never sold in Australia, as Ford Australia argued that the segment of the market was in decline.

== Third generation (2007) ==
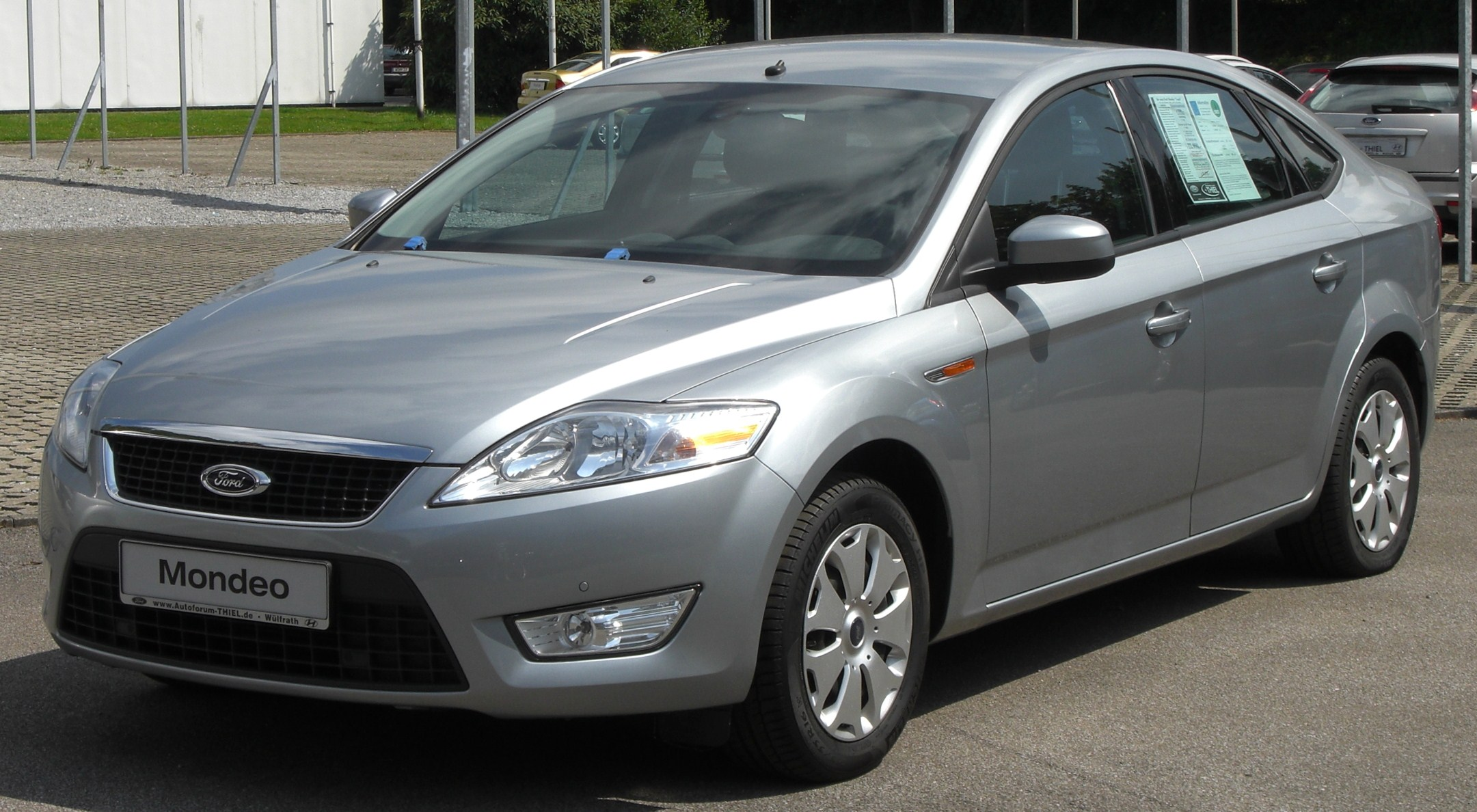

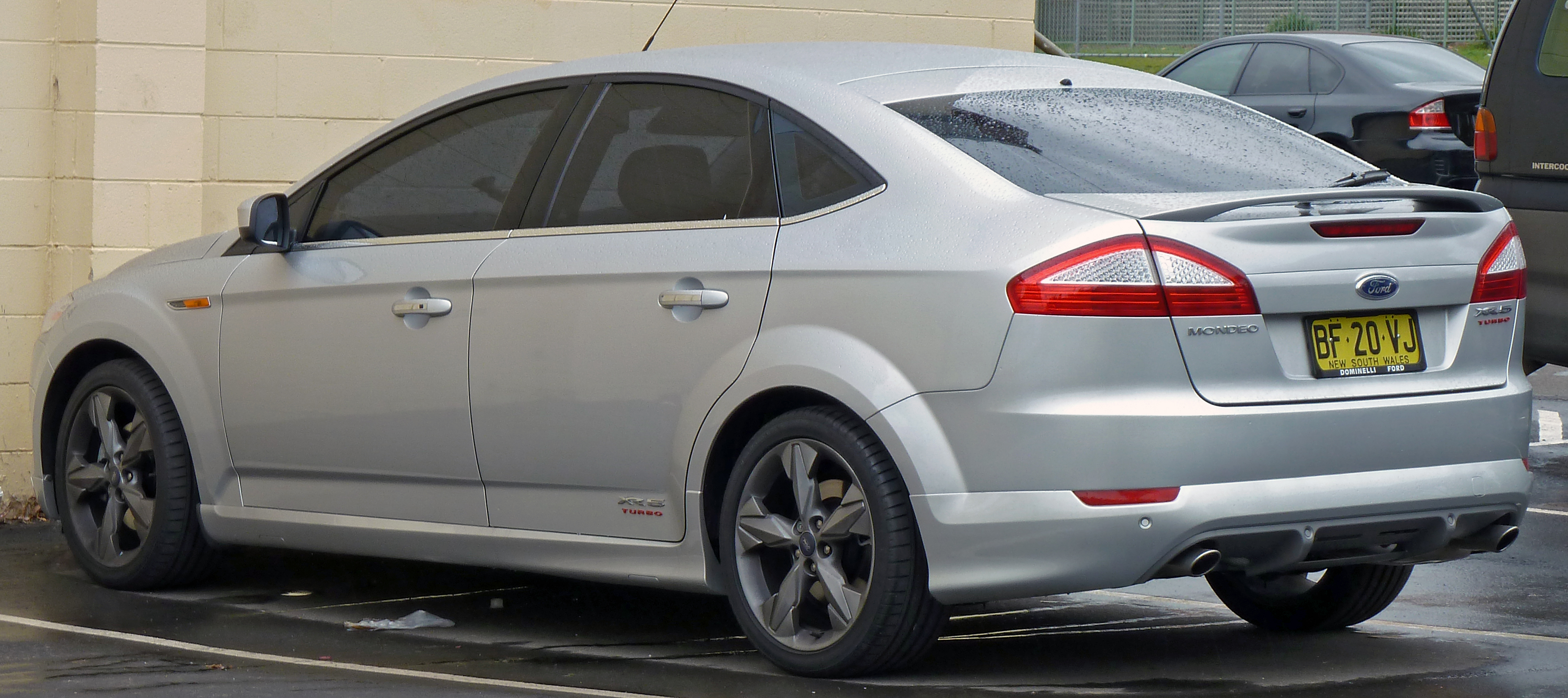
Third-generation Mondeo

The third-generation Mondeo was introduced in late 2006. Based on the EUCD platform developed with Volvo, the platform was the same as that used in the new large MPVs Galaxy and S-MAX. Its design theme was first shown as the Ford Iosis concept at the 2005 Frankfurt Motor Show, which gave an indication to the look of the Mk IV Mondeo. The new car, in estate bodystyle, was pre-launched in 'concept' form at the Paris Motor Show in September 2006.

As with the previous model, the Mk IV Mondeo was not marketed in the United States or Canada because Ford sold the same-class Fusion, which was launched in 2005. The 2007 Mondeo marked the return to the Australian market after a six-year absence, due to a resurgence in popularity of medium-sized cars in the last few years.

In September 2010, a mid-cycle facelifted Mk IV Mondeo was introduced with some changes, such as the new EcoBoost engines and LED daytime running lights. The front and rear of the car had minor changes, the biggest being the new design theme dubbed as the Kinetic Design. The interior was improved, with a use of better materials.

== Fourth generation (2012) ==
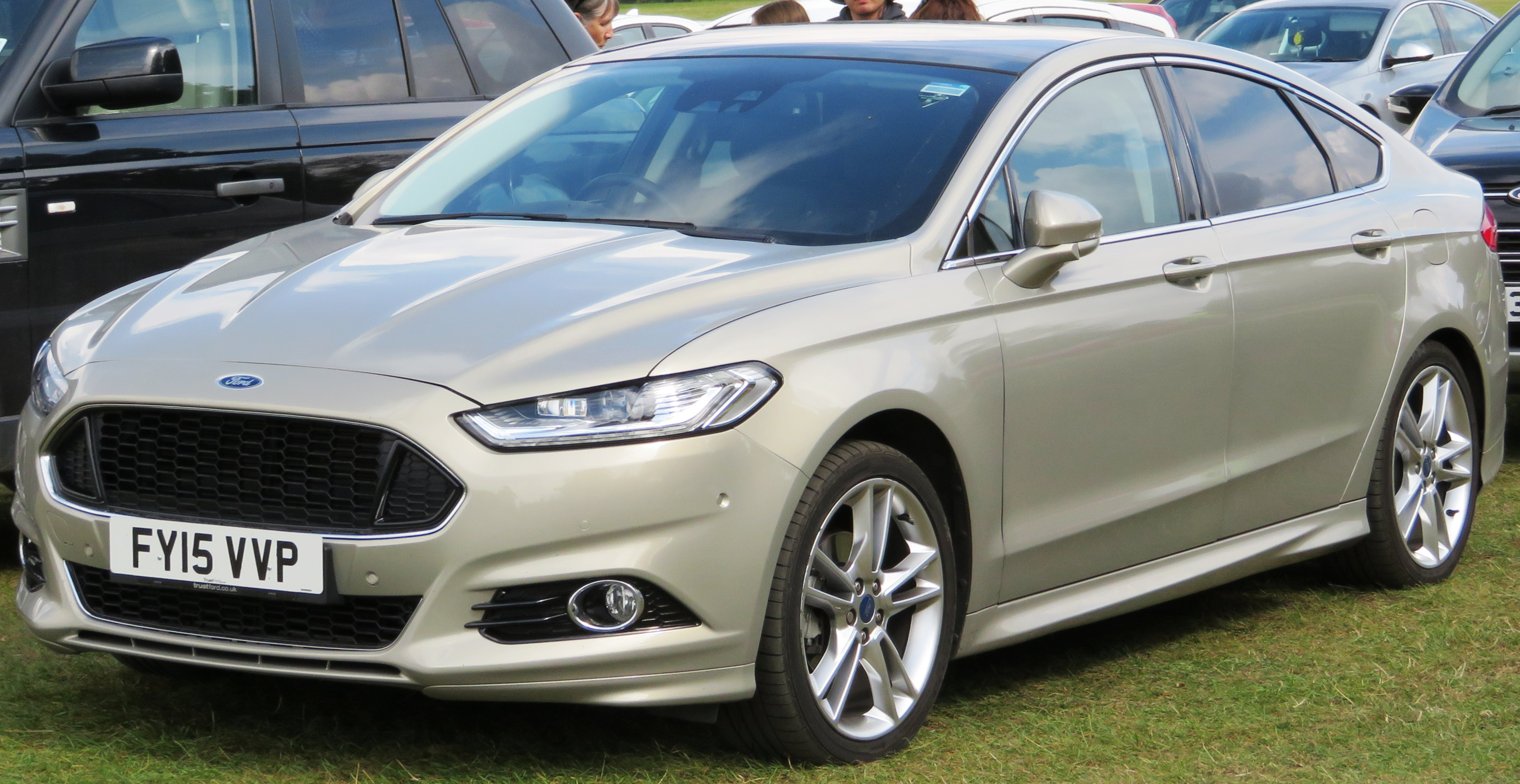

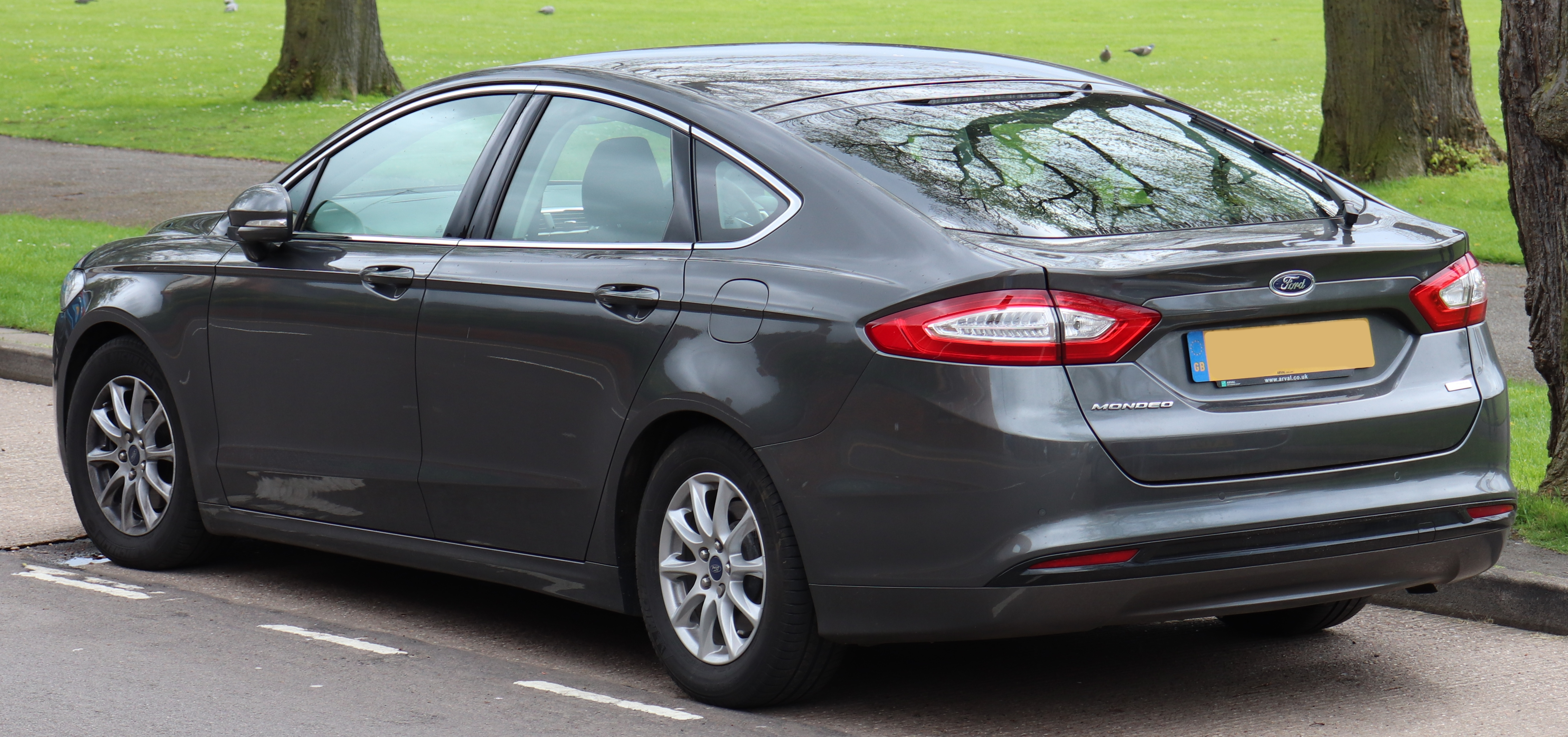
Fourth-generation Mondeo

The fourth-generation Mondeo was presented by Ford at the 2012 North American International Auto Show in Detroit, Michigan. Due to the merge of both models, the vehicle was marketed as the Fusion in the Americas. With a design team based in Detroit for the planning and global launch phase, the new model took styling cues from the previous generation Ford Mondeo, and previous generation American Ford Fusion. Like then current redesigns of the Focus and Fiesta before it, the new Mondeo used a global platform shared with the now-identical Fusion marketed in North America.

The range does not include five- or six-cylinder engines; on launch, it had a complete range of Ford EcoBoost engines.

Ford ended Mondeo production at their Valencia Plant in March 2022 as buyer interest shifted to crossovers and SUVs.

== Fifth generation (2022) ==
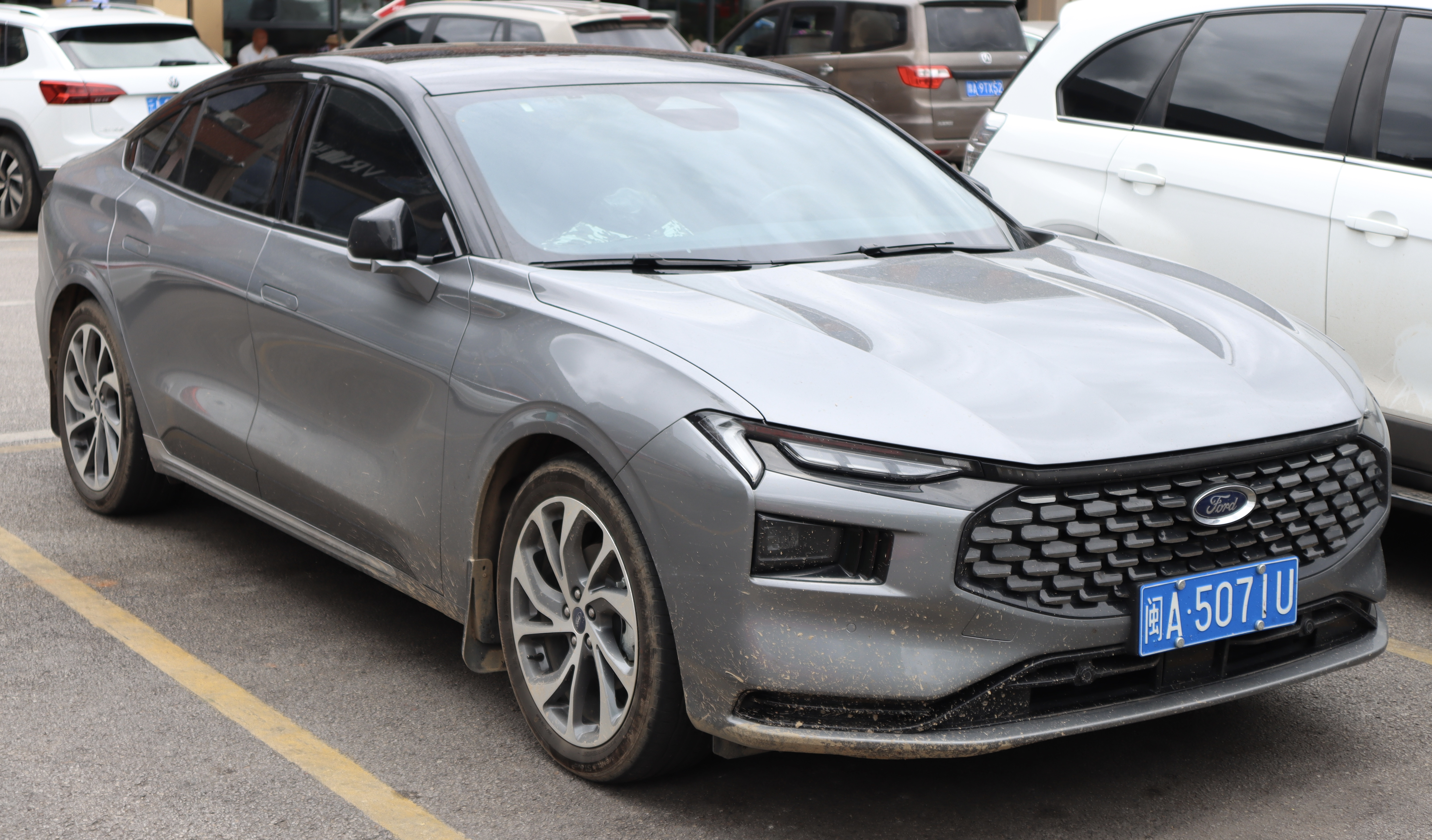

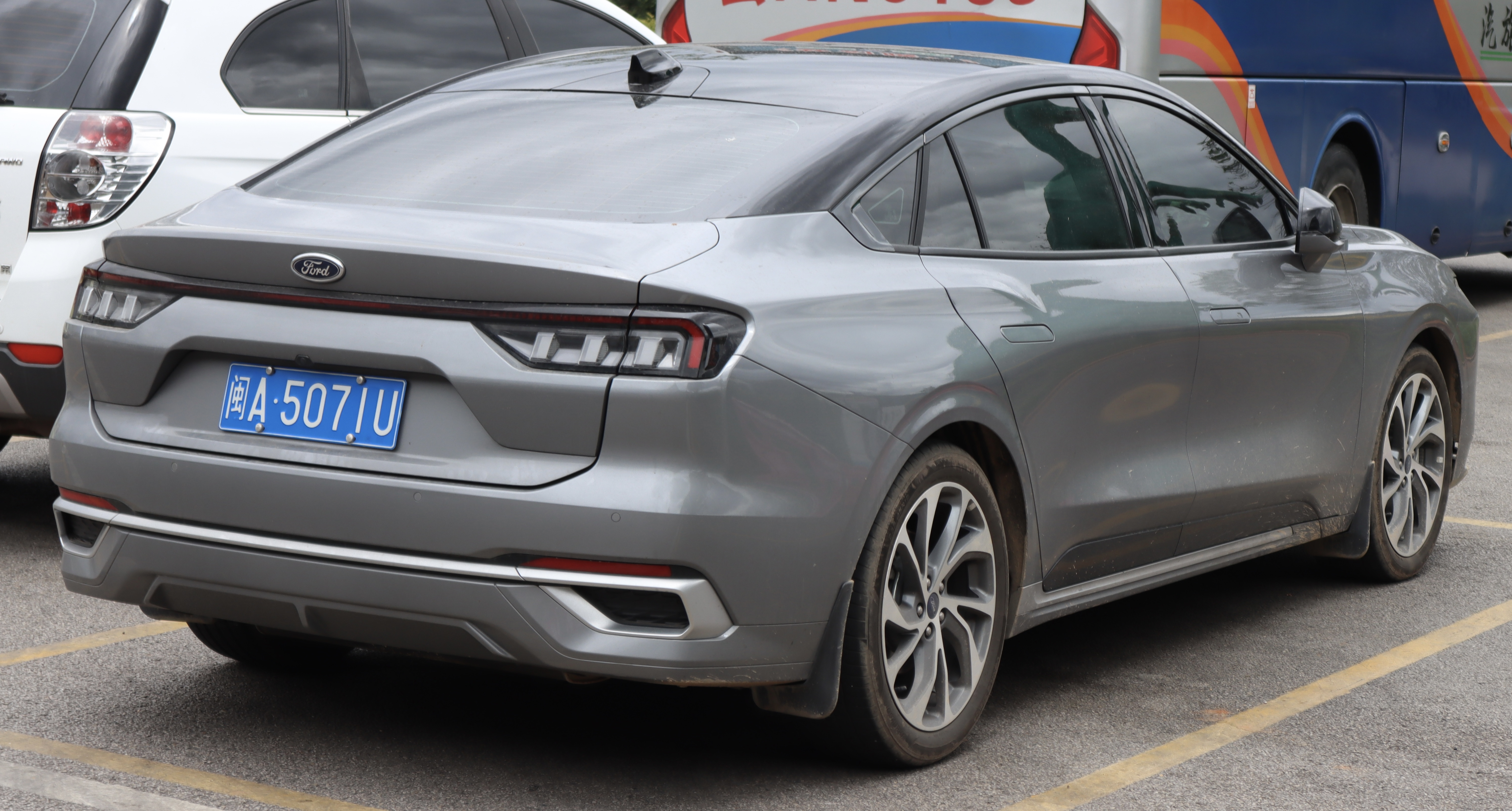
Fifth-generation Mondeo

The fifth-generation Mondeo saloon was released in China in January 2022. Ford confirmed that the model would not be marketed in Europe and North America. It is marketed in the Middle East as the Ford Taurus.

== Motorsport ==
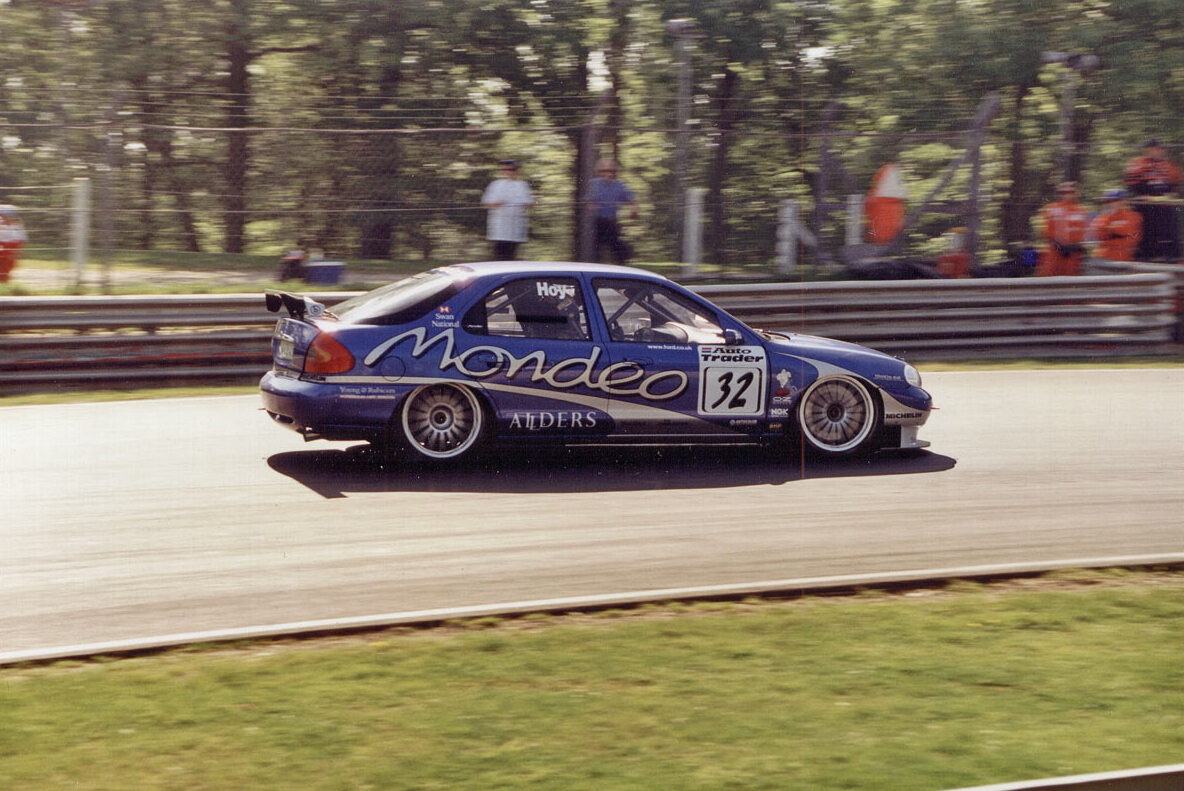
Will Hoy driving for Ford Mondeo Racing in the 1998 British Touring Car Championship

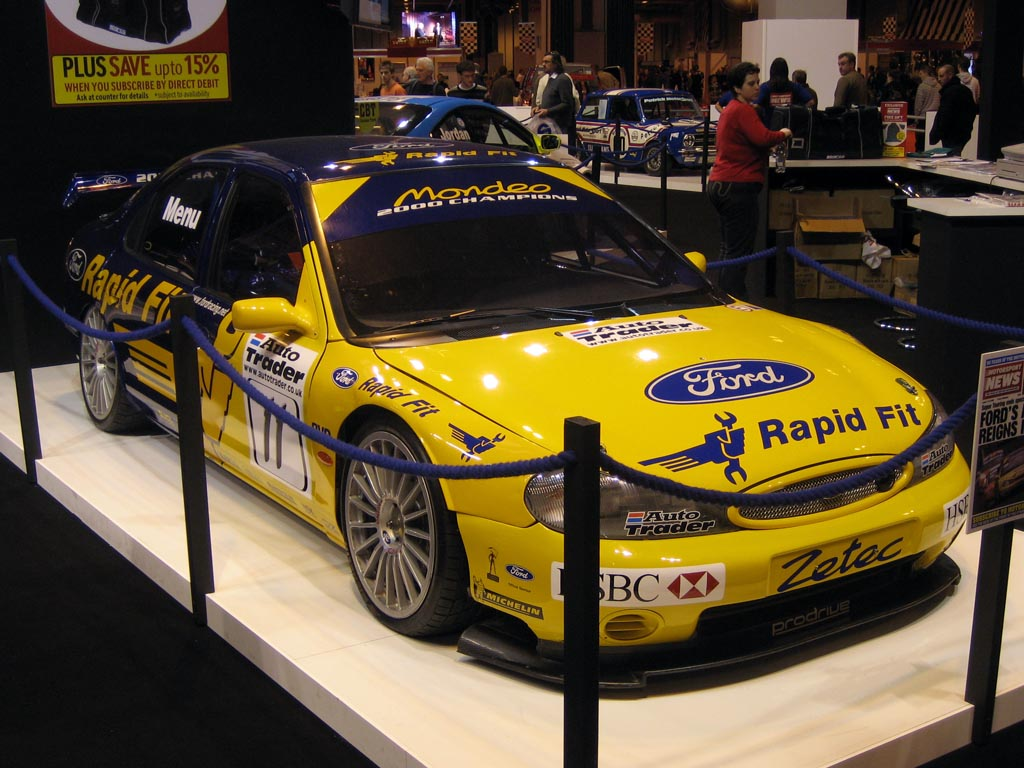
Ford Mondeo as driven by Alain Menu for Ford Team Mondeo in the 2000 British Touring Car Championship

The Mondeo competed in the British Touring Car Championship (BTCC) between 1993 and 2000. The cars, prepared by former series champion Andy Rouse, did not enter the 1993 season until the eighth round, at Pembrey, in Wales. Rouse and Paul Radisich were the drivers in the Mondeo's first season. Radisich went on to win the FIA World Touring Car Cup in both 1993 and 1994 driving a Mondeo.

Ford ran a factory-sponsored team, called Ford Team Mondeo, for eight seasons. Andy Rouse Engineering ran the cars from 1993 to 1995, when West Surrey Racing ran the works team from 1996 to 1998, with Prodrive taking over beginning 1999.

In 2000, the team expanded from two cars to three when drivers Alain Menu and Anthony Reid were joined by 1998 series champion Rickard Rydell, recruited from the disbanded Volvo team. The team dominated the season of 2000, finishing 1–2–3 (Menu–Reid–Rydell) in the drivers' standings and winning the manufacturers' championship by 104 points.

A complete overhaul of the BTCC following the season of 2000 had the Super Touring regulations scrapped as the series moved towards less expensive, but slower race cars. Ford withdrew from BTCC competition prior to 2001.

The touring cars, after their withdrawal, went on sale to the public and are now in the hands of other drivers. Two of the 2000 series Mondeos have been spotted in the BRSCC series of LMA Euro saloons; drivers known to own them at present are Bernard Hogarth and Alvin Powell.

The Mk I and Mk II Mondeo have followed many other previous Ford models into the sport of banger racing in the United Kingdom, and with plenty of older cars being available for very little money, the Mondeo is now a popular car to race due to its consistent handling. The Zetec engines are converted to run off a carb setup and the Mondeo bodyshell is durable, but they are also rigid, with many drivers getting injured in high-speed impacts. Mondeos are more common on-track than the Sierra and Mk III Granada.

In Argentina, the Mondeo is one of several cars to compete in the local Top Race racing category; its body is handcrafted in reinforced fiberglass. The Mondeo is so far the most successful car in the category, with three championship titles in the TRV6 class and two championship titles in the Top Race series (formerly Top Race Junior).

The winning drivers in the TRV6 class were Omar Martínez (2006), José María López (2009), and Guido Falaschi (Copa América 2010) with the Mondeo II (based on the MkIII Mondeo), and in the TR Junior category, the championship was won by Gonzalo Perlo in 2008 and Humberto Krujoski in 2010. In 2009, the Mondeo III (based on the MkIV Mondeo) bodystyle was approved and presented as an option within the category; however, the Mondeo II bodywork is still being used.

Similarly, in the United States, the Fusion/Mondeo Mk 5 bodywork began use for the sixth-generation body in the NASCAR Sprint Cup Series starting in 2013, replacing the current Mazda6-based Fusion.

== Awards ==
- 1993 What Car? Car of the Year
- 1994 Semperit Irish Car of the Year
- 1994 European Car of the Year
- 1997 Top 10: Most Reliable Cars made in Britain.
- 1998 Best Selling Family Car in Britain.
- 2001 What Car? Car of the Year
- 2001 Top Gear Car of The Year
- 2005 Awarded "Excellent" (Euro NCAP)
- 2006 What Car? Best Used Family Car
- 2007 Auto Express Car of the Year (Auto Express quoted the Mondeo is: "Ford's finest ever car")
- 2007 Auto Express Best Family Car
- 2007 Fifth Gear: Best Family Newcomer
- 2007 Top Gear Car of the Year (Joint COTY, Subaru Legacy Outback)
- 2007 RACV: Best Mid Size Car Over $28,000
- 2007 Drive Car of the Year: Best Medium Car
- 2008 Semperit Irish Car of the Year
- 2008 What Car? Best Estate Car
- 2008 What Car? Best Family Car
- 2008 Motor Trend: Top 10 Car
- 2008 Car and Driver: 10 Best Car
- 2008 Car News Magazine (Taiwan): Best Domestic Large Sedan
- 2008 Sina: Best Driving Performance Car
- 2008 Drive Car of the Year: Best Medium Car
- 2008 The Caravan Club: Tow Car of the Year (Mondeo 2.5t Estate)
- 2008 Auto Express Best Family Car
- 2009 What Car? Best Estate Car
- 2009 What Car? Best Family Car
- 2009 New Zealand Automobile Association: Best Medium Car
- 2010 Drive Car of the Year: Best Medium Car
- 2011 What Car? Best Estate Car
- 2011 What Car? Best Family Car
- 2012 What Car? Best Estate Car
- 2012 What Car? Best Family Car
- 2012 Now Magazine: "Most Attractive Car for a Man To Drive"
- 2013 What Car? Best Estate Car
- 2013 What Car? Best Family Car
- 2016 Continental Irish Car of the Year

== Sales ==
Year	Europe	China	Mexico
1997	322,716		
1998	310,809		
1999	227,167		
2000	178,130		
2001	286,794		
2002	250,316		
2003	199,370		
2004	183,357	22,988	
2005	165,303	40,664	4,668
2006	131,749	48,922	2,674
2007	148,818	32,062	824
2008	163,262	12	115
2009	117,565	0	
2010	96,898	0	
2011	86,471	0	
2012	69,871	0	
2013	50,180	35,747	
2014	45,405	109,806	
2015	79,673	120,202	
2016	70,900	103,274	
2017	56,173	112,158	
2018	49,596	45,405	
2019	39,555	17,642	
2020	21,222	25,027	
2021	12,584	33,302	
2022		60,883	
2023		59,904	
2024		61,822	
2025		40,122	

== See also ==
- Mondeo Man, stereotypical figure in the 1990s England
