= Lancia Medusa =

Concept car designed by Italdesign and built by Lancia

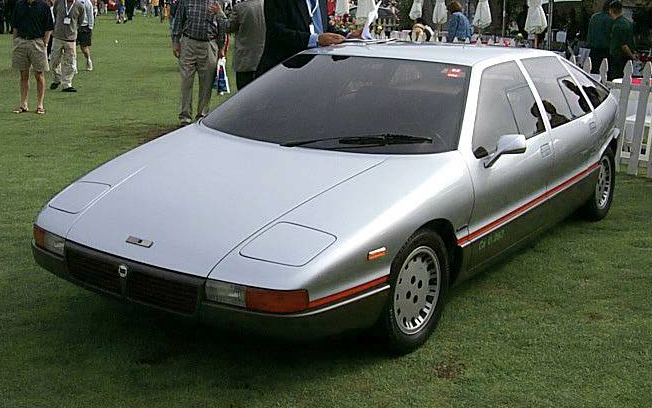

Overview
- Manufacturer: Lancia
- Production: 1980; 1 made
- Designer: Giorgetto Giugiaro at Italdesign

Body and chassis
- Class: Concept car
- Body style: 4-door sedan hatchback
- Layout: Transverse rear mid-engine, rear-wheel-drive
- Related: Lancia Montecarlo

Powertrain
- Engine: 2.0 L Lampredi I4
- Transmission: 5-speed manual

Dimensions
- Wheelbase: 2,790 mm (110 in)
- Length: 4,405 mm (173.4 in)
- Width: 1,813 mm (71.4 in)
- Height: 1,263 mm (49.7 in)

The Lancia Medusa is an Italian concept vehicle built by Lancia. It was designed by Giorgetto Giugiaro and debuted in 1980 at the Turin Auto Show.

== Specifications ==
The Medusa is based on the chassis and mechanics of the Lancia Montecarlo, and thus uses the same mid mounted 2.0 L (2,000 cc) Lampredi I4 engine, producing 120 PS (88 kW; 120 hp) at 6,000 rpm and 170 Nm (125 lb ft) of torque, coupled to a 5-speed manual transmission from that car.

== Design ==
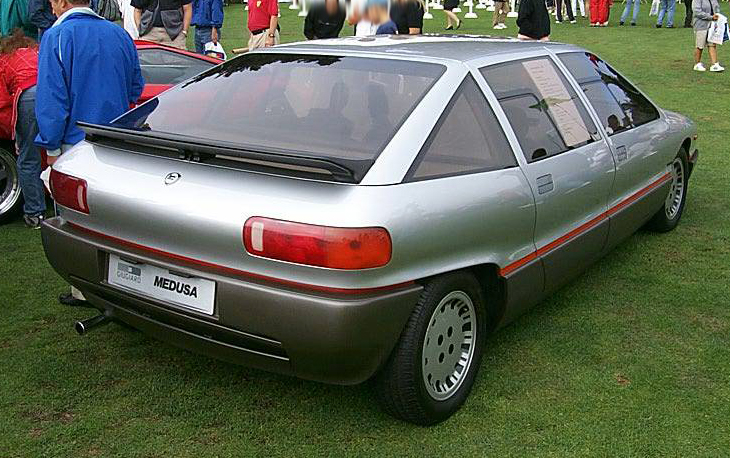
Medusa rear end

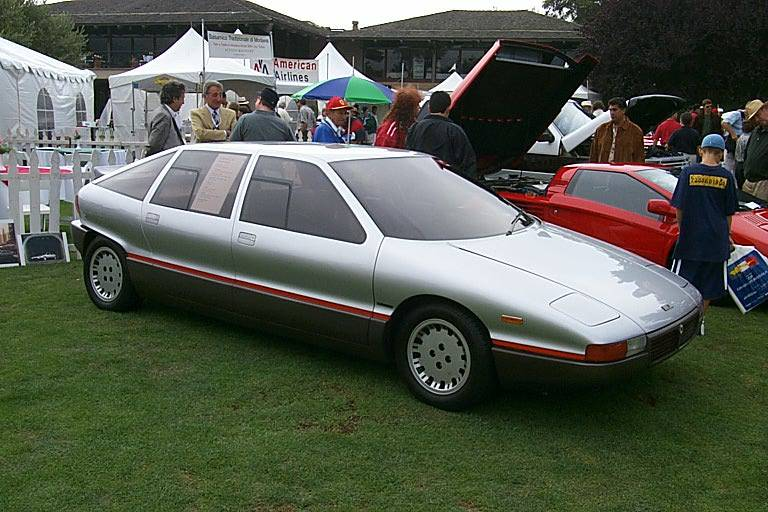
Medusa 3/4 view

The Medusa was designed by Italian designer Giorgetto Giugiaro in 1979. Giugiaro designed the car to be as aerodynamic as possible, aiming for a target of 0.25 Cd, with the final design achieving a Cd of 0.263. The original the clay model reportedly had achieved a lower reading of 0.255 Cd, but the addition of side mirrors, indicator repeaters and a radiator caused it to go up. The Medusa featured many design elements that were tailored to help it achieve better aerodynamics. Features such as pop up headlights, door handles and window glazing that sit flush with the body, inset turn signal repeaters and doors that wrapped up into the roof all helped the Medusa to be as aerodynamic as possible.

== Derivatives ==
A derivative for the DeLorean Motor Company was produced in mock-up form, the DMC-24 4-door 4-seater sedan, by Italdesign.

A derivative for Lamborghini was produced by Italdesign, which went to the prototype stage and ended up as a concept car, the Lamborghini Marco Polo.
