= Namco Pony Super =

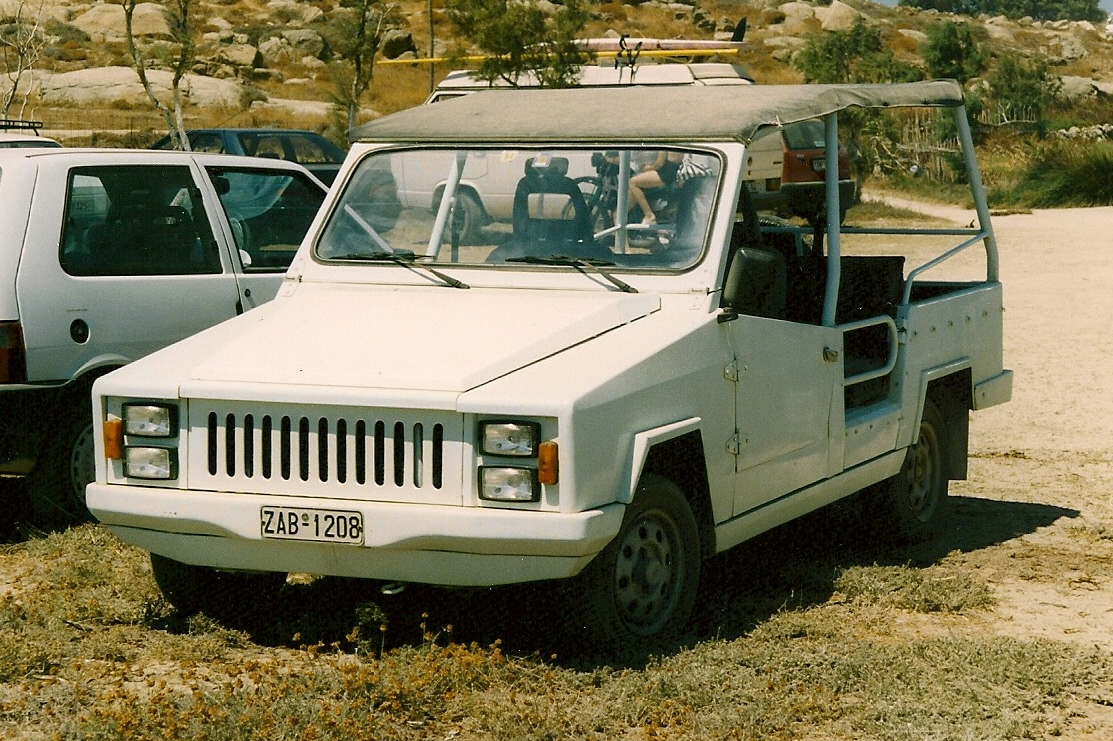
NAMCO Pony Super (4-door, 1986 model).

The Pony Super is a light utility vehicle that was produced between 1985 and 1992 by the Greek manufacturer NAMCO as a successor to the first generation Pony-Citroën model.

The Pony Super faced challenges in the Greek commercial market and was ultimately unsuccessful, with only a few hundred units produced.

== History ==
The first-generation Pony was introduced in 1975 and was derived from the Baby-Brousse, a car originally developed by a team of French engineers in Côte d'Ivoire. This design was adopted by Citroën, which then licensed the car to NAMCO. The Pony was continuously modified during its lifespan, with a significant number of revisions. Additionally, NAMCO achieved market success aided by favorable taxation laws applied to vehicles in its category. With 17,000 units being sold, the first-generation Pony was discontinued in 1983, prompting the design of a better model.

The Pony Super used Ford mechanical components and was a new design, developed by NAMCO along with Inthelco GmbH (a company majority owned by NAMCO). Multiple versions were produced, consisting of 950cc with 45hp (34kW), 1100cc with 55hp (41kW), 1300cc with 69hp (51kW), and 1600cc with 54hp (40kW) diesel engines. These models were available in two-door as well as four-door configurations. NAMCO originally planned to export the car to the U.S. with a 1900cc engine, with the company aiming for a production volume of 20,000 units per year. However, the costs and prospects were miscalculated, ultimately prompting NAMCO to abandon the plan.

The Pony Super's success was limited due to its primitive design. Additionally, favorable tax laws that had boosted the sales of similar cars in Greece had been modified shortly before the car's introduction, as during the 1980s Greece joined the European Union. Production was largely terminated in 1992, but a few Pony Supers were later produced under license in Bulgaria.
