= Lamborghini Marco Polo =

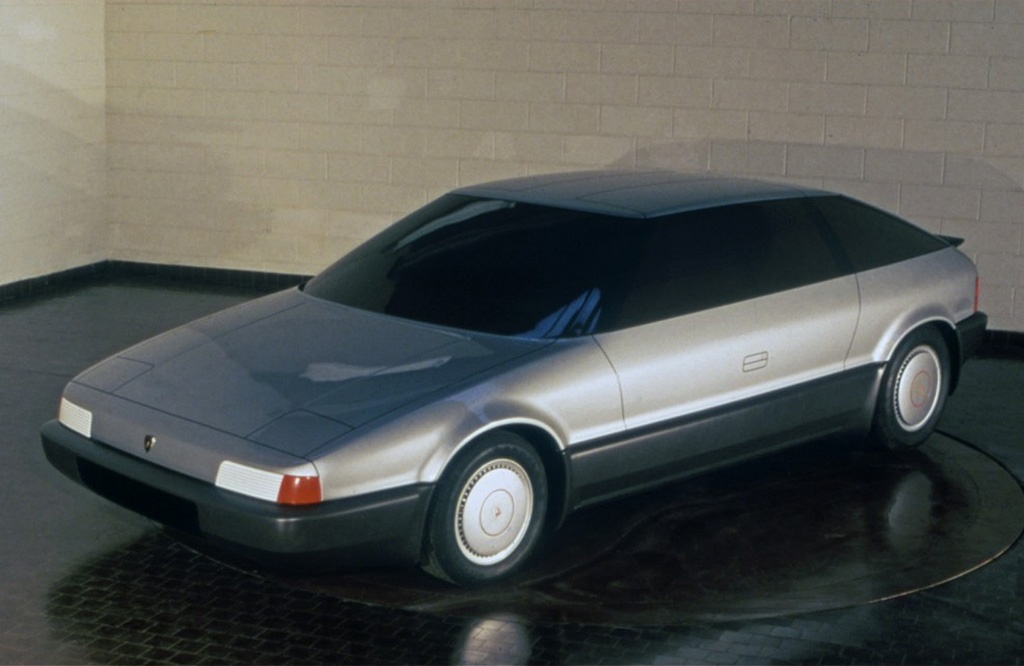
- Lamborghini Marco Polo concept car by Italdesign

Overview
- Manufacturer: Italdesign Giugiaro
- Production: 1982
- Designer: Giorgetto Giugiaro

Body and chassis
- Class: Concept car
- Body style: MR 2+2 coupe
- Doors: Gullwing

Dimensions
- Wheelbase: 2,750 mm (108.3 in)
- Length: 4,575 mm (180.1 in)
- Width: 1,870 mm (73.6 in)
- Height: 1,300 mm (51.2 in)

The Lamborghini Marco Polo, or Italdesign Marco Polo, was a styling exercise by Italdesign Giugiaro.

Introduced in 1982 at the Bologna Motor Show, the Marco Polo was inspired by the Lancia Medusa concept car designed by Italdesign two years prior. The design was originally intended for an upcoming DeLorean DMC-24 sedan, but DMC ran out of money before the concept was finished. Italdesign then recycled the design into a concept for Lamborghini. The wheels on the Marco Polo are standard DeLorean alloys covered by hubcaps. The Marco Polo is not a running prototype, rather the design is only a painted plastic model for aerodynamic research. Italdesign said the Lamborghini badge on the nose of the car was not to imply any official design program undertaken with the factory, but that it was instead intended as a homage to the brand. Although Lamborghini has a more exciting image to its products, Giugiaro decided to give this study a less aggressive line, preferring instead to focus on aerodynamic efficiency in order to provide a quieter passenger compartment and higher speed while maintaining fuel consumption. As such, the Marco Polo features a drag coefficient of 0.24, compared to the Medusa's 0.26.

The Marco Polo, while a four-seater, has only two gull-wing doors, like the ones used on the Marzal, which can be opened from either the front or back seats.
