= Namco Tiger Armored Vehicle =

- Type: Reconnaissance Scout Vehicle
- Place of origin: Greece

Production history
- Designed: 1982
- Manufacturer: Namco

Specifications
- Engine: 5.2-liter Chrysler engine
- Suspension: 4x4

The Tiger 4x4 Armored Reconnaissance Scout Vehicle was one of several vehicles proposed to the Hellenic Army by Namco, a Greek vehicle manufacturer. The particular vehicle was designed in 1982.

Namco published an advertising brochure for the vehicle including a detailed depiction (drawing) and technical specifications (power provided by a 5.2 L (320 cu in) Chrysler engine), as well as a photograph of what appeared to be a vehicle prototype. However, it has not been confirmed that a functioning prototype was completed.

Other vehicles, including an APC based on the company's Milicar truck chassis and a jeep-type 4x4 vehicle do not seem to have passed the design stage. Namco had made a reasonable investment on military trucks and vehicles, realizing that its "bread-winning" Pony-Citroen was near the end of its career. However, for a number of reasons, including the Greek state's "preference" for vehicles produced by Steyr-Hellas (now ELBO) few (trucks) or none (armored vehicles) were ordered by the Greek state, with almost catastrophic results for this company.
