= World car =

Model of automobile designed for global markets

A world car is a car platform designed to suit the needs of global automotive markets with minimal changes in each market where it is sold. The goal of a world car program is to save costs and increase quality by standardizing parts and design for a single vehicle in a certain class, in hopes of using the cost savings to deliver a superior product that satisfies expectations for quality, appeal and performance of automobile buyers worldwide. Examples include the Ford Mondeo and Focus, modern no-frills cars such as the Fiat Palio, Dacia Logan and VW Fox along with luxury cars such as the BMW 3 Series and Lexus LS.

== History of the world car ==
In the pioneering days of the automotive industry, automobiles were primarily designed for the local market that the manufacturer was based in, such as the Ford Model T, which was engineered to cope with the rural lifestyle and rugged terrain that most automobile buyers in the United States had to contend with in the early days of the automobile. However, the Model T was perhaps the first world car, with knock-down kits being assembled in locations such as Canada, England and Argentina.

The two largest manufacturers at the time, Ford Motor Company and General Motors (GM), both of the United States, were focused on expanding globally, with General Motors either acquiring or partnering with local automobile manufacturers, such as Opel of Germany, Vauxhall of England and Holden of Australia, while Ford created overseas subsidiaries such as Ford of Germany, Ford of Britain and Ford Australia. Both Ford and GM's overseas subsidiaries would later develop their own line of bespoke automobiles independently of their American parents.

In 1933, Ford introduced their first car designed for European tastes that was not sold in the United States, the Ford Model Y, developed by Ford of Britain, and also manufactured by Ford of Germany as the Ford Köln. General Motors responded with the Opel 1.2 litre, developed by GM in the United States but exclusively built and sold in Europe. This would begin the divergence of vehicles sold by Ford and General Motors worldwide. In Australia, the Coupé utility was beginning to catch on in popularity, as “a vehicle to go to church in on a Sunday and which can carry our pigs to market on Mondays.”

=== Economy cars ===
The Volkswagen Beetle was a success worldwide due to affordability and economy. To a lesser extent, its European contemporaries succeeded in global markets with the original Mini and Citroën 2CV.

The Toyota Corolla and Nissan Sunny were two of the first passenger cars from Japan to be popular worldwide, thanks to a combination of durability and economy.

The 1970s energy crisis saw Japanese and European manufacturers make inroads worldwide as American and Australian manufacturers focused on larger and less fuel-efficient cars.

=== Diversification ===
In the 1980s, compacts including the Beetle evolved into the C-segment, featuring vehicles such as the Volkswagen Golf and Ford Escort, along with the supermini class such as the Opel Corsa and Fiat Panda, which has become the leading segment in the European car market.

Japanese domestic market vehicles increasingly focused on performance or luxury, featuring exclusive vehicles or variants of existing cars unique to Japan, such as the Nissan Laurel and Toyota Soarer.

Buoyed by exports to the United States, Volkswagen opened a plant in Westmoreland County, Pennsylvania in 1978. Honda, Nissan, Toyota along with an Isuzu-Subaru joint venture also opened plants in the United States during the 1980s, while their Japanese compatriots Mazda, Suzuki and Mitsubishi Motors partnered with their American affiliates, Ford, General Motors and Chrysler, respectively, to create joint ventures in the lucrative North American market.

The Honda Accord was the first vehicle from a foreign brand that became the top selling car in the United States in 1989. From then on, Japanese manufacturers designed their midsize sedans to primarily appeal to the lucrative family sedan sector in the United States, with their sales in Japan and other markets an afterthought. Toyota launched the first Camry that exceeded Japanese width restrictions in 1991, a successful attempt that saw them surpass the Accord and Ford Taurus for best-selling passenger car in the United States, and Honda launched a bespoke Accord for the North American market in 1997 that was not sold in Japan or Europe.

=== Modern attempts at a world car ===
Models in the C-segment have usually shared a platform worldwide, with minimal styling changes for each market they are sold in. The most successful C-segment car is the Toyota Corolla.

The Ford Mondeo was the first modern attempt by an automaker to make a mainstream D-segment car, billed as a "world car", that was specifically designed to be successful in both the United States and Europe. It succeeded the Ford Sierra in Europe and the Ford Tempo in North America.

== Market needs worldwide ==
Despite being a global design initially, world cars have to have specific changes made per national laws/regulations, or cultural differences / market tastes where these are divergent. For example, fuel prices vary greatly in different countries, and this affects the choice of engine fitted.

An example of this would be the Volkswagen Golf. The Mk VI version was only offered with a 2.5-litre 5-cylinder petrol in the United States and Canada, but in Europe, it has 1.4, 1.4 TSI turbo, 1.6, 2.0, 2.0 turbo 4-cylinder and 3.2 V6 petrol and 1.9 SDI diesel and 2.0 TDI turbodiesel engines. The differences between market needs are not just reflected by equipment levels. In Europe the Golf offers multiple trim levels, compared to North America where it is only available in two versions, and sold as a premium hatchback rather than a workaday family car as in Europe.
