= Lohr Fardier =

Lohr Fardier FL 500
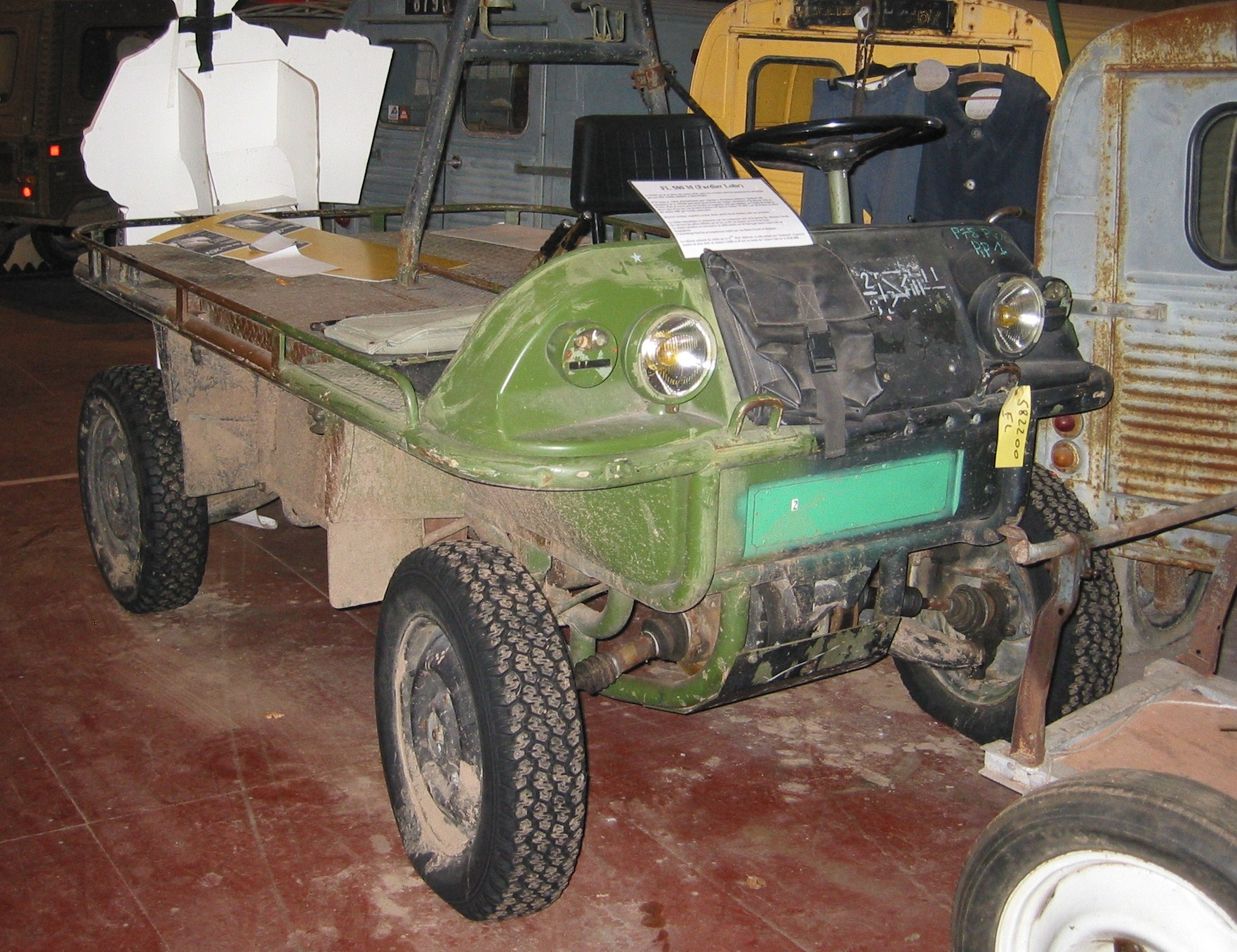
- Type: Wheeled all-terrain vehicle
- Place of origin: France

Specifications
- Mass: 600 kg
- Crew: 4
- Engine: petrol 29 hp
- Suspension: 4x4

The Lohr Fardier, introduced in 1976, is a French light general purpose 4x4 vehicle, capable of being transported by air, developed by Lohr Industrie for use by airborne troops.

== History ==
This light 4x4 vehicle was developed by SOFRAMAG (later Lohr Industrie) for the French Army airborne troops, which used 300 of these.

France has replaced its FL 500 with the Auverland A3F fast attack vehicle; while it can't be assured whether the vehicles supplied to Spain and Tunisia and Argentina are still in service.

== Description ==
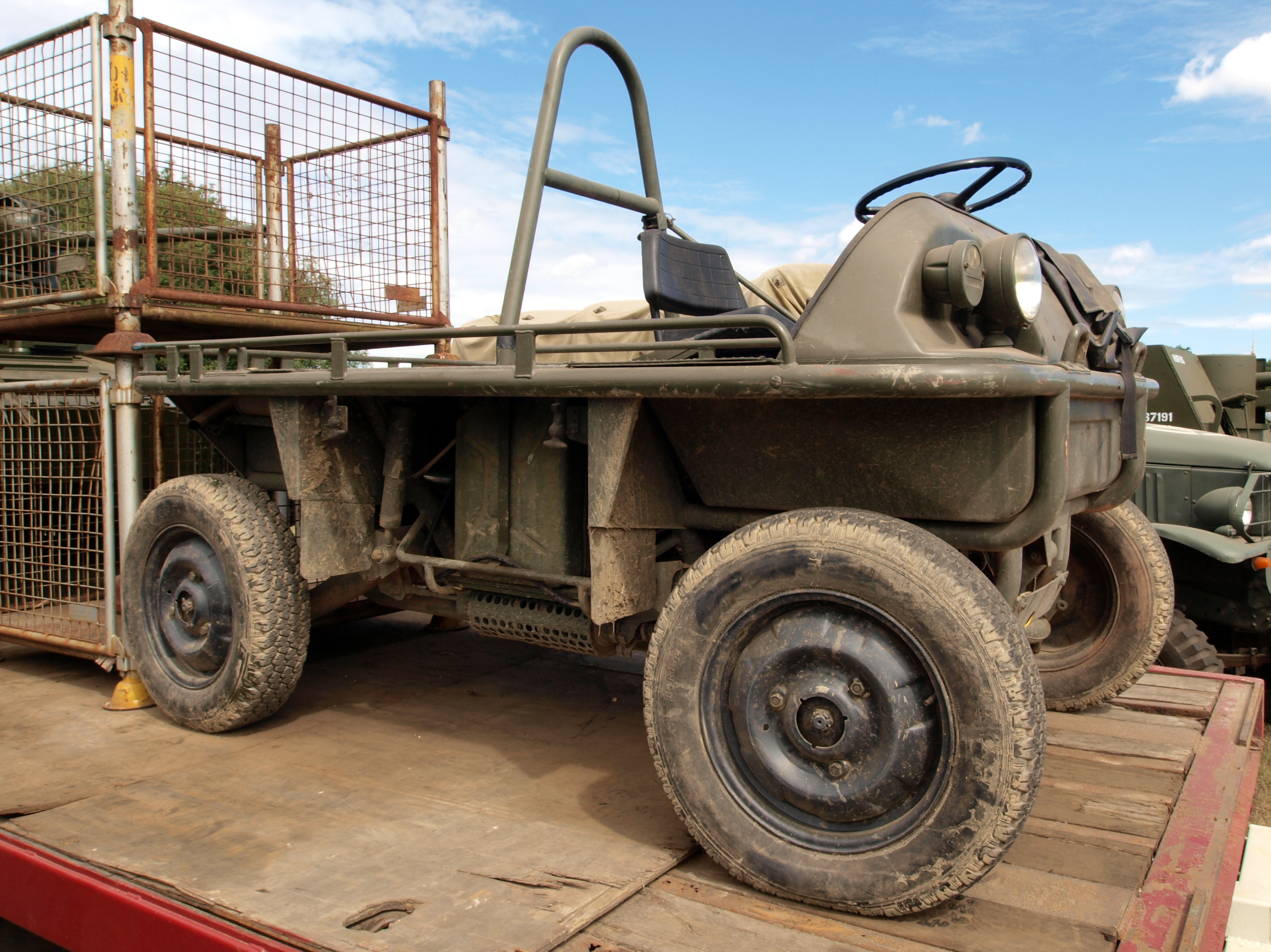
Side view of Fardier

It has a chassis built of welded tubes, with the cargo area at the back (formed by aluminium panels), the engine in the middle (transversally positioned) and the driver at the front left (protected by a demountable U-shaped safety bar). Each axle has a transmission unit, with coil-spring suspension. Each rear wheel has an independent parking brake, while brakes in all 4 wheels are with discs. The vehicle has a dual lighting system for full lighting or for reduced "convoy" lighting.

The FL 500 can tow up to 800 kg, a typical cargo is a 120 mm mortar. Other loads include communication equipment, general cargo, or up to 2 stretchers.

It can be air transported either by cargo plane or by helicopter:

- A C-130 Hercules or C-160 Transall can carry up to 6 for air-dropping, or up to 12 as general cargo
- A Puma helicopter can carry a FL 500/501 and a 120 mm mortar.

== Specifications ==
The engine is a Citroen 602cc flat twin. This is the same unit that powered the militarised Citroen Mehari, which was a development of the Dyane engine. All the running gear is from the Citroen A series "family" except for the steering column which is from the H van. The vacuum carburettor limits the speed to about 35 km/h. There is a differential slip limiter worked by belts and levers.

== Users ==
=== Former ===
- France
- Spain
- Tunisia
- Argentina

== See also ==
Luchtmobiel Speciaal Voertuig — Lohr VLA (Véhicule Légère Aeromobile)
