= Chevrolet Spark =

City car

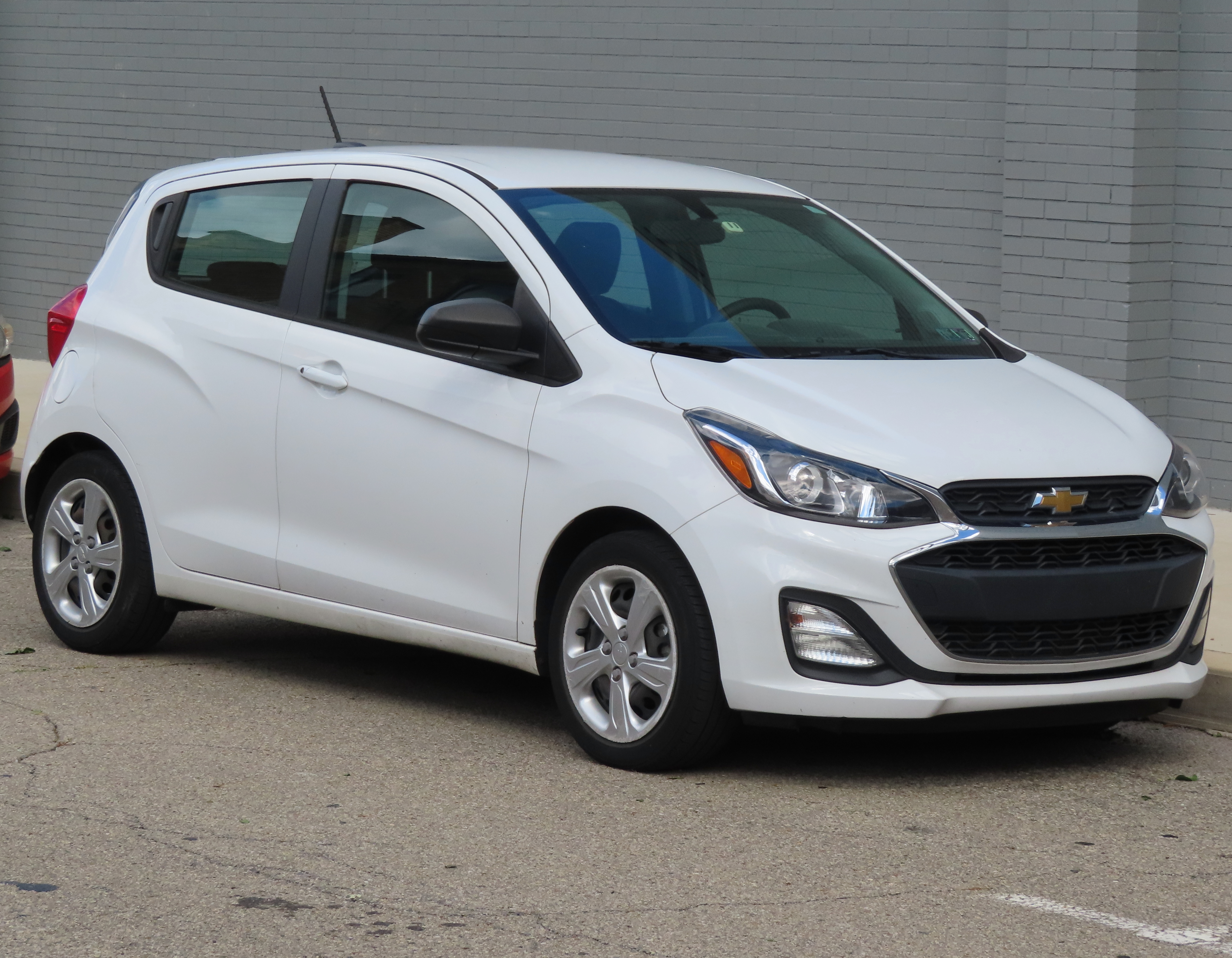

Overview
- Manufacturer: Daewoo Motors (1998–2002); Rodae (1999–2008); GM Daewoo (2002–2011); GM Korea (2011–2022)
- Production: 1998–2022

Body and chassis
- Class: City car (A)
- Body style: 5-door hatchback
- Layout: Front-engine, front-wheel-drive

Chronology
- Predecessor: Daewoo Tico

The Chevrolet Spark (Korean: 쉐보레 스파크) is a city car manufactured by General Motors's subsidiary GM Korea from 1998 to 2022. The vehicle was developed by Daewoo and introduced in 1998 as the Daewoo Matiz (대우 마티즈). In 2002, General Motors purchased Daewoo Motors, which was marketing the vehicle with several GM marques and nameplates.

The third generation was marketed globally, prominently under the Chevrolet brand in North America as the Chevrolet Spark and in Australia and New Zealand as the Holden Barina Spark. The fourth generation was launched in 2015, known as the Holden Spark in Australia and New Zealand. It also serves as the basis for the Opel Karl in Europe, Vauxhall Viva in the UK, and VinFast Fadil in Vietnam, the latter being manufactured under license.

A limited-production all-electric version, the Chevrolet Spark EV, was released in the U.S. in selected markets in California and Oregon in June 2013. The Spark EV was the first all-electric passenger car marketed by General Motors since the EV1 was discontinued in 1999, and also the first offered for retail sale by GM (the EV1 was available only on lease).

In the South Korean market, the Spark complies with South Korean "light car" (Korean: 경차, romanized: Gyeongcha) regulations, which regulate overall vehicle dimensions and engine capacity with tax and parking fee benefits.

Production of the Spark at the Changwon, South Korea assembly plant ended in 2022. The plant would instead produce the second-generation Trax.

== First generation (M100, M150; 1998) ==
First generation
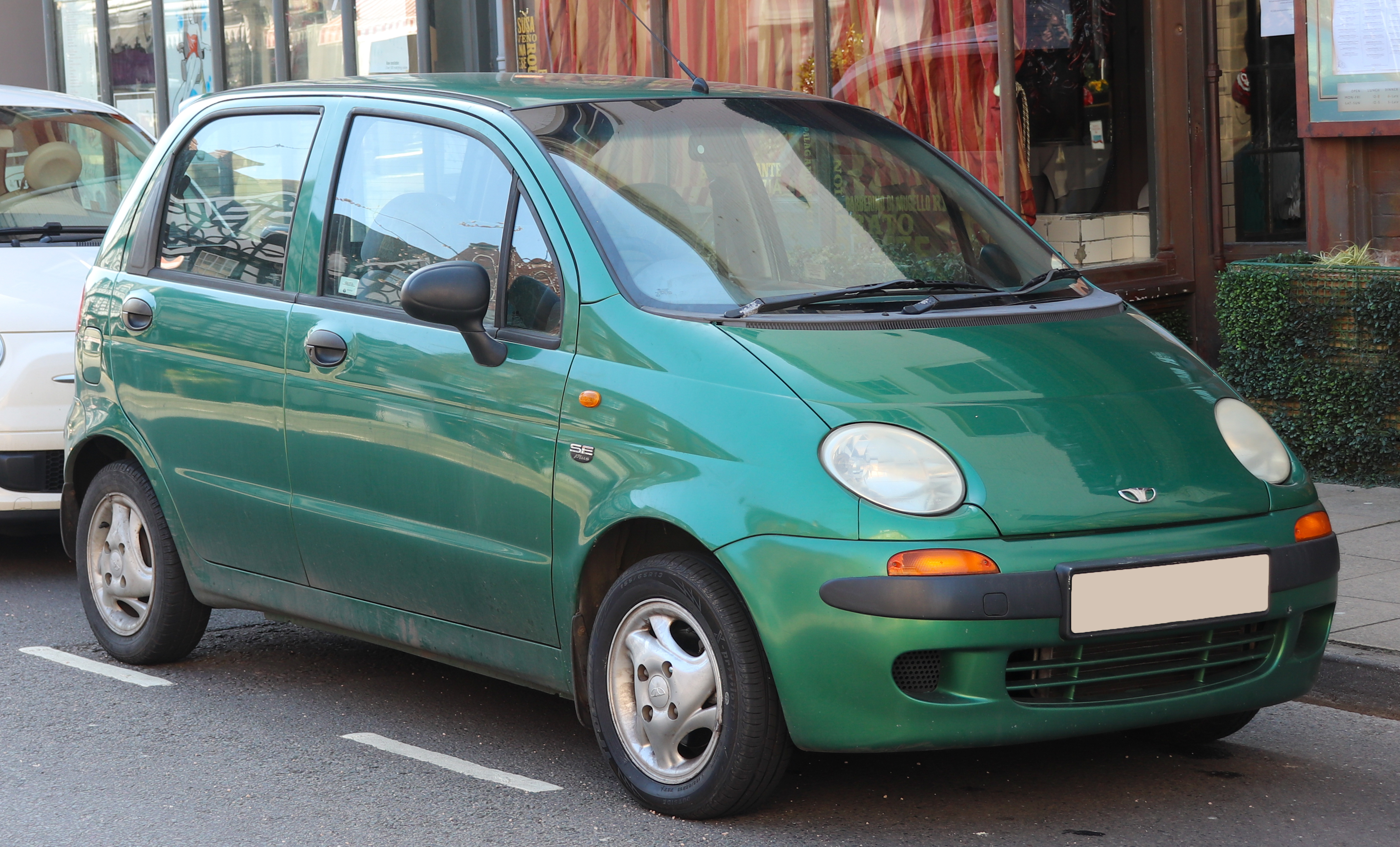

Overview
- Model code: M100; M150
- Also called: Daewoo Matiz (1998–2002); Chevrolet Matiz; UzDaewoo Matiz (Uzbekistan); Ravon Matiz (Russia); Formosa Matiz (Taiwan); FSO Matiz (Poland); Pontiac Matiz (México); Pontiac G2 (México); Chevrolet Lechi (China); Baojun Lechi (China); Chevrolet Exclusive (Pakistan); Chevrolet Joy (Pakistan); Chevrolet Taxi 7:24 Chronos (Colombia)
- Production: 1998–2005 (South Korea); 1998–2007 (M100, Poland); 1999–2008 (M100, Romania); 1998–2002 (India); 2001–2018 (Uzbekistan); 2010–2016 (China)
- Assembly: South Korea: Changwon; Uzbekistan: Asaka (UzDaewoo); Poland: Warsaw (FSO); Romania: Craiova (Rodae); Iran: Kerman (Kerman Khodro); China: Liuzhou, Guangxi (SAIC-GM-Wuling); India: Surajpur (Daewoo India); Pakistan: Karachi (Nexus); Taiwan: Taipei (Formosa); Vietnam: Hanoi (VIDAMCO)
- Designer: Fabrizio Giugiaro at Italdesign

Body and chassis
- Body style: 5-door hatchback; 5-door panel van
- Related: Daewoo Tico; Chery QQ3

Powertrain
- Engine: Petrol: 0.8 L M-TEC I3; 1.0 L S-TEC I4; 1.2 L S-TEC I4 (China)
- Transmission: 5-speed manual; 3-speed automatic

Dimensions
- Wheelbase: 2,340 mm (92.1 in)
- Length: 3,495 mm (137.6 in)
- Width: 1,495 mm (58.9 in)
- Height: 1,485 mm (58.5 in)
- Curb weight: 795–850 kilograms (1,753–1,874 lb)

=== M100 (1998–2000) ===
The production of Daewoo Matiz started in 1998, and it was marketed in South Korea and many European markets, internally designated the M100. The exterior design is based on the Italdesign Lucciola, a 1993 concept evolved from the 1992 Italdesign Cinquecento concept by Fabrizio Giugiaro at Italdesign, which had been rejected by Fiat. The 0.8-litre gasoline engine and the transmission were carryovers from the Daewoo Tico, but as of 2013 used a multipoint fuel injection system. Engineering was carried out at Daewoo's Worthing Technical Centre in England. The car became the best selling Daewoo model in Europe and in India for the next four years.

It was based on the Daewoo Tico, a licensed-built Suzuki Alto, with which both Tico and Matiz share mechanicals and suspensions. From this origin was derived its characteristic narrow width, imposed by the Japanese kei car tax category.

The Matiz was launched with just a 0.8-litre straight-three engine, derived from the Suzuki F8B. It developed a maximum power of 51 hp (38 kW) and a maximum torque of 68.5 N⋅m (51 lb⋅ft), and had a combined consumption of 6.4 L/100 km (44 mpg_{‑imp}). It had a top speed of 144 km/h (89 mph) and could reach 100 km/h (62 mph) in 17 seconds. This engine was developed from the Suzuki unit used in the Tico by Tickford, a UK company based in Milton Keynes. The Tickford connection was acknowledged in the brochures distributed in UK showrooms.

It was released with three trim levels: E, S, and SE. The latter had air conditioning, wheel covers, body-colored bumpers, rear spoiler, fog lights, and a stereo, with optional features such as roof rails, power steering, central locking, electric front windows, antilock brakes, and driver airbag. In certain markets, it was also available with an automatic transmission.

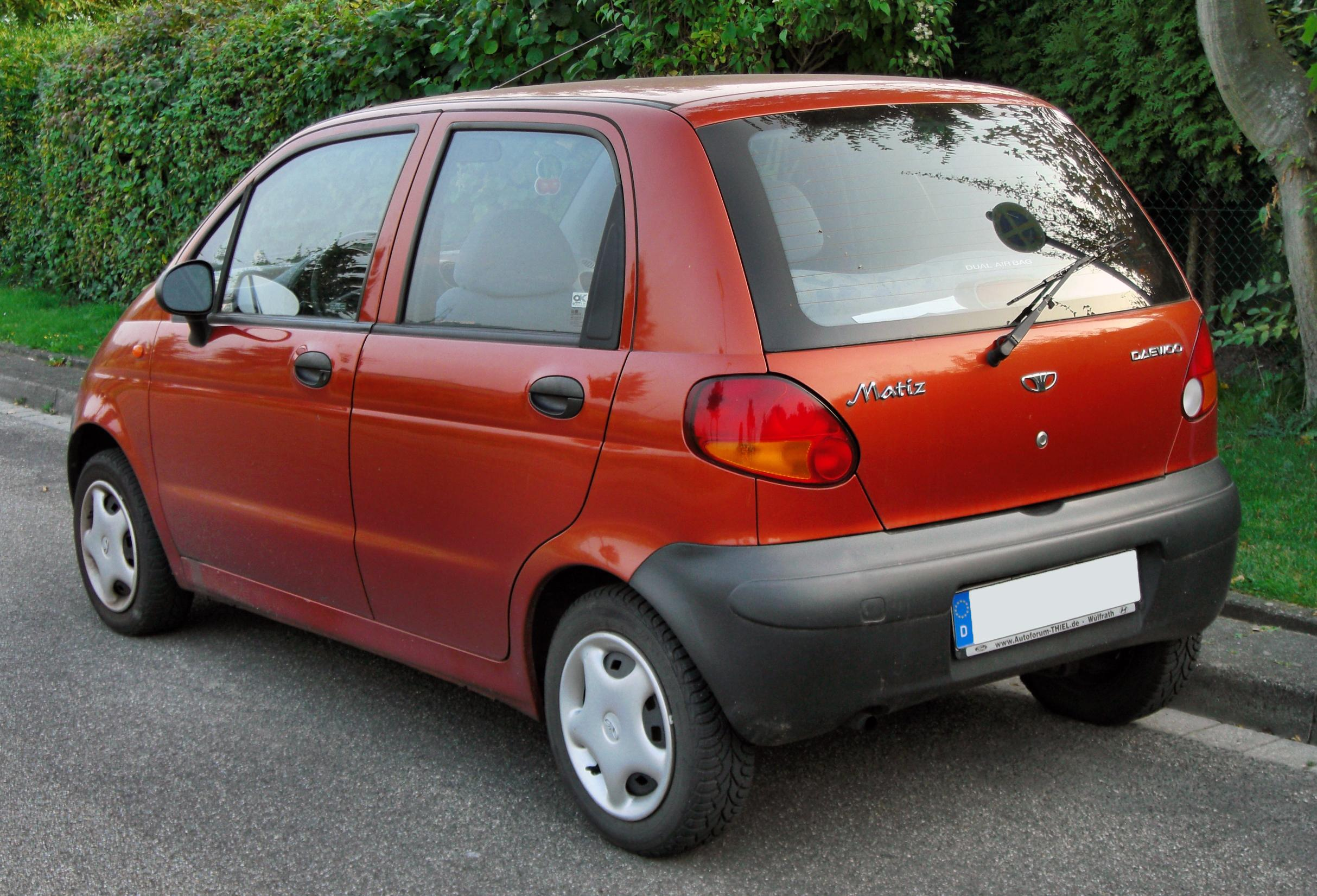
Daewoo Matiz (M100; pre-facelift)

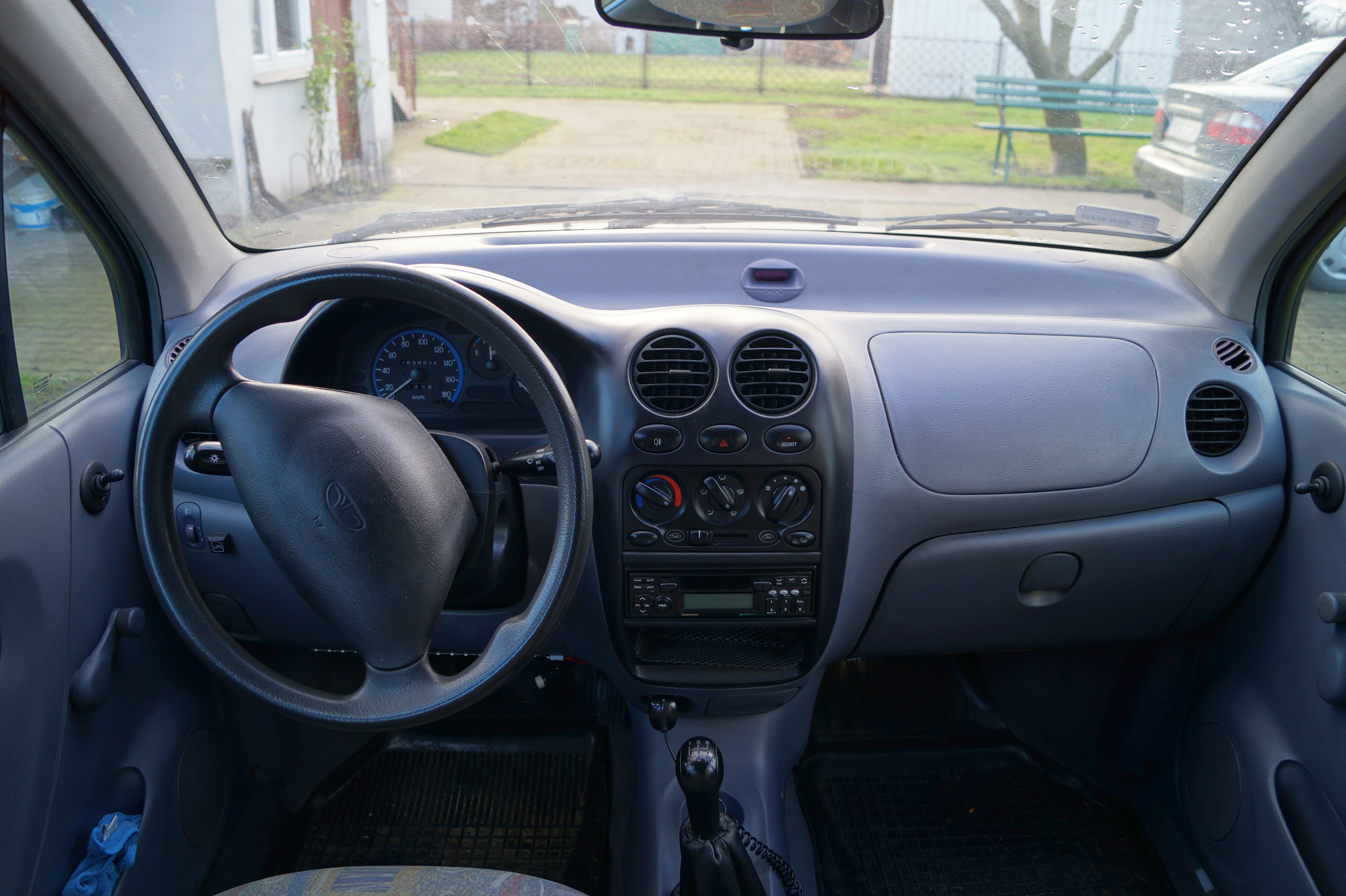
Interior (M100; pre-facelift)

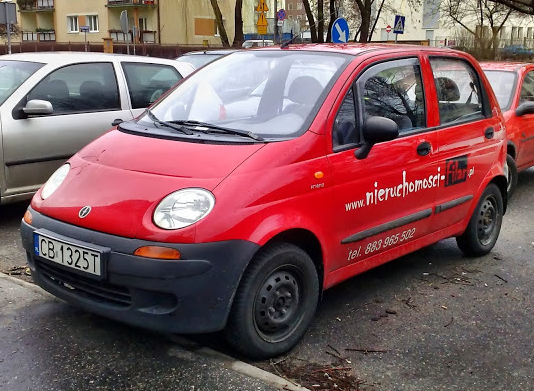
FSO Matiz

=== M150 (2000–2005) ===
This facelift was designed at Daewoo's Worthing Technical Centre in England, and introduced in South Korea in late 2000, and exported from 2001. The front-end structure was modified to accommodate a four-cylinder engine, although the introduction of this engine, the 1.0-litre S-Tec unit, was delayed until after Daewoo's takeover by General Motors in 2002.

The M150 continued to be produced by GM-Uzbekistan (previously UzDaewooAuto) in Uzbekistan until 2018. The car was launched to the Russian market as the Ravon Matiz in 2016, but was soon discontinued. In South Korea and Japan this updated Matiz was sold under the name Daewoo Matiz II.

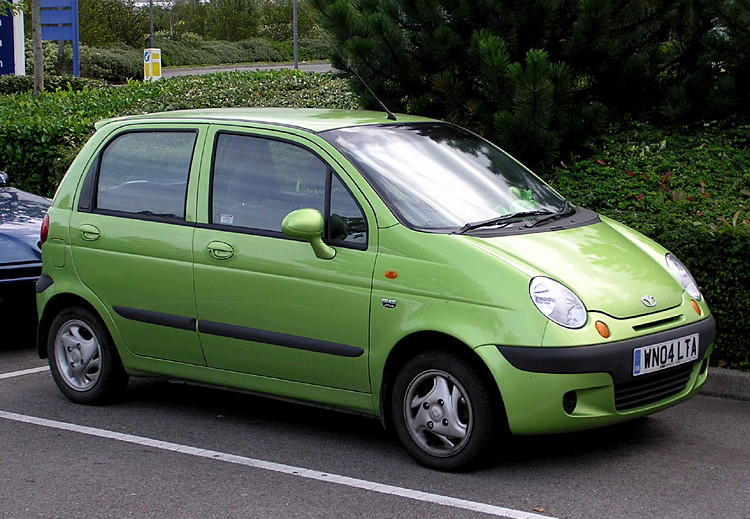
Facelifted M150-series Daewoo Matiz

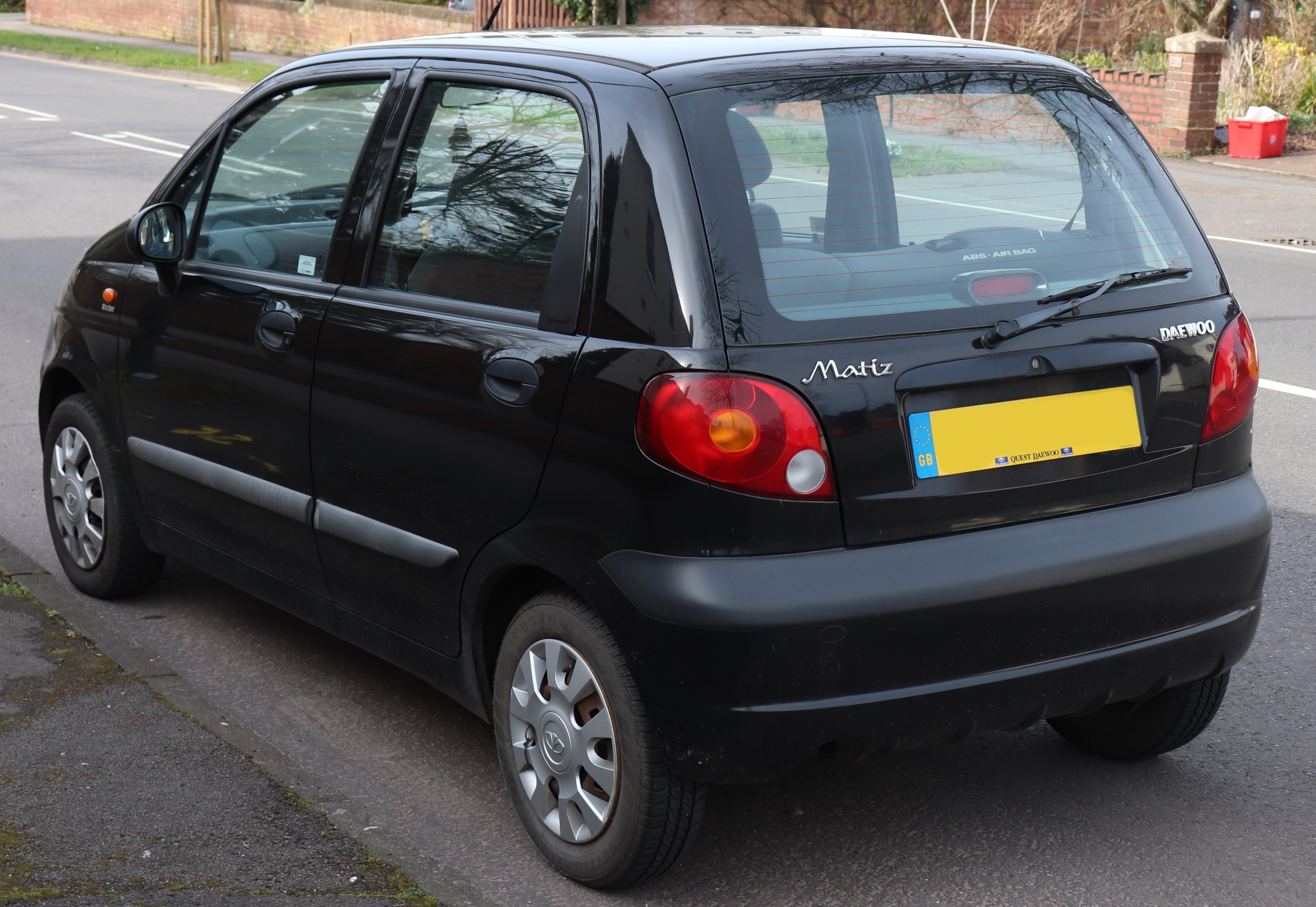
Facelifted M150-series Daewoo Matiz

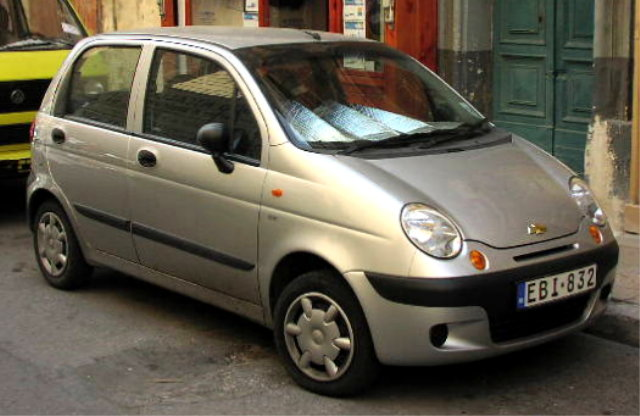
Chevrolet Matiz

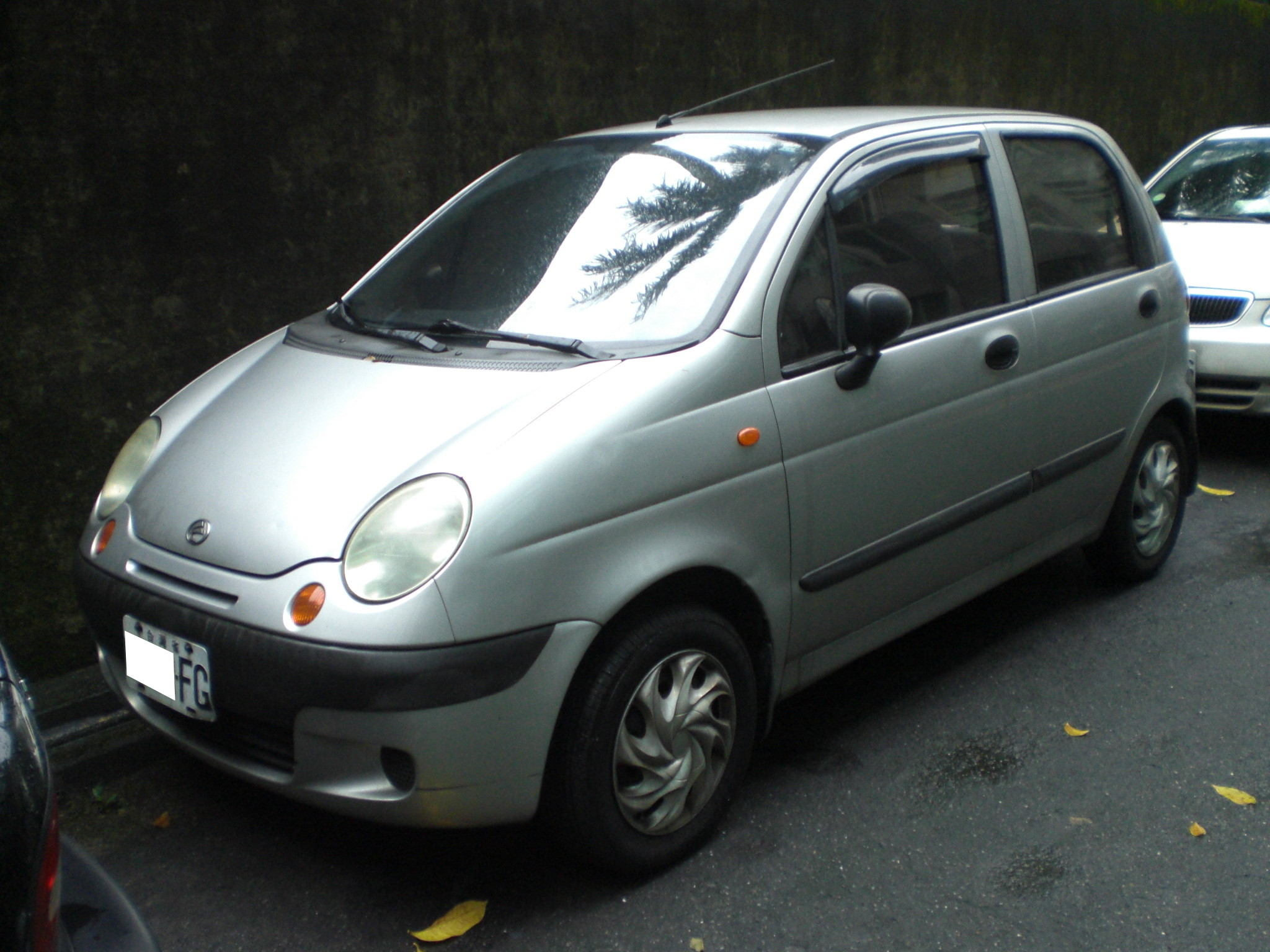
Formosa (FAC) Matiz

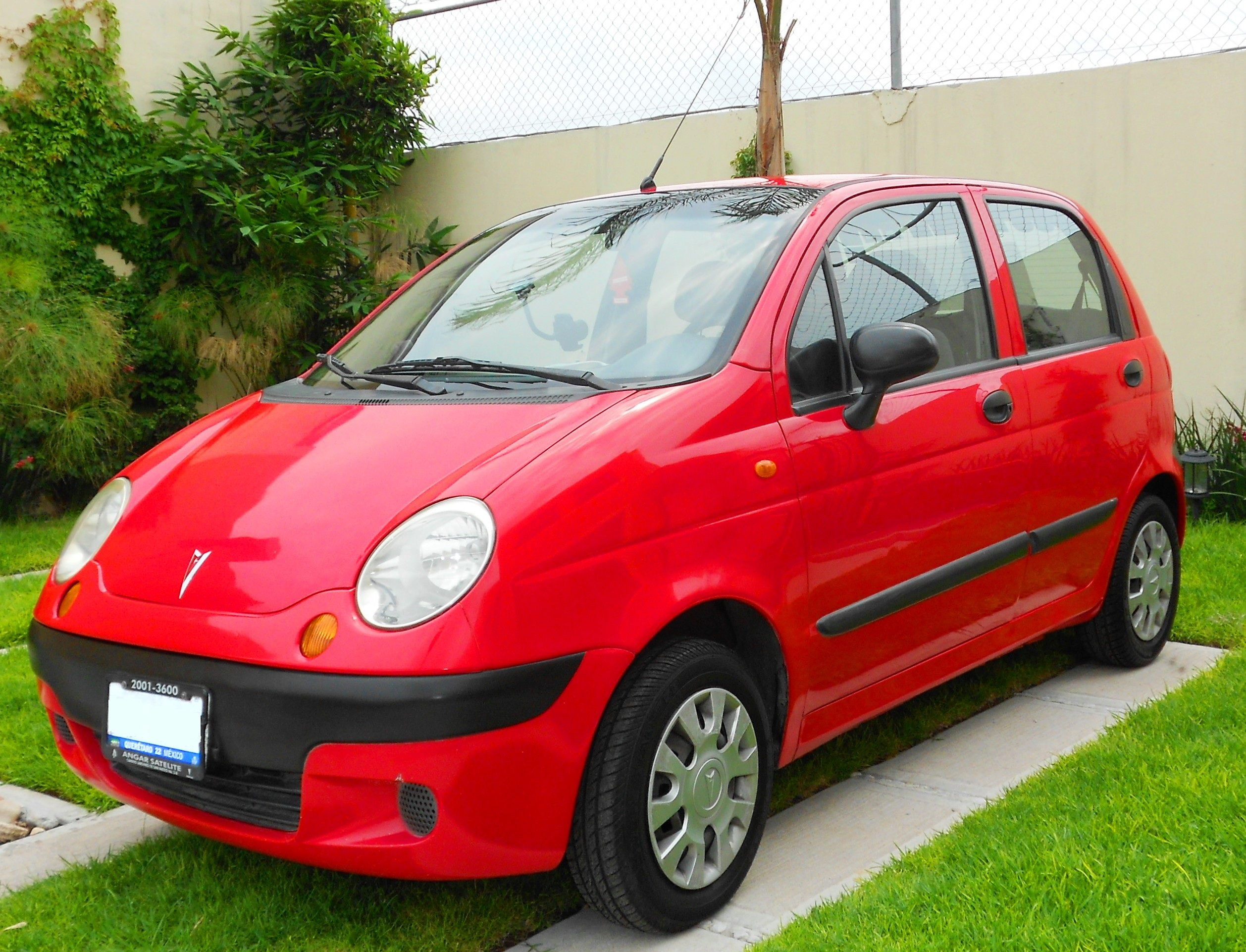
Pontiac Matiz

=== Lechi (China) ===
In China, the car was marketed as the Chevrolet Lechi. It remained in production until 2012, when an updated version was introduced as the Baojun Lechi. It is to be offered under both Chevrolet and Baojun brands during a transition period. The Lechi has also received certain powertrain updates, making the car economical enough to qualify for a subsidy and a tax break from the Chinese government.

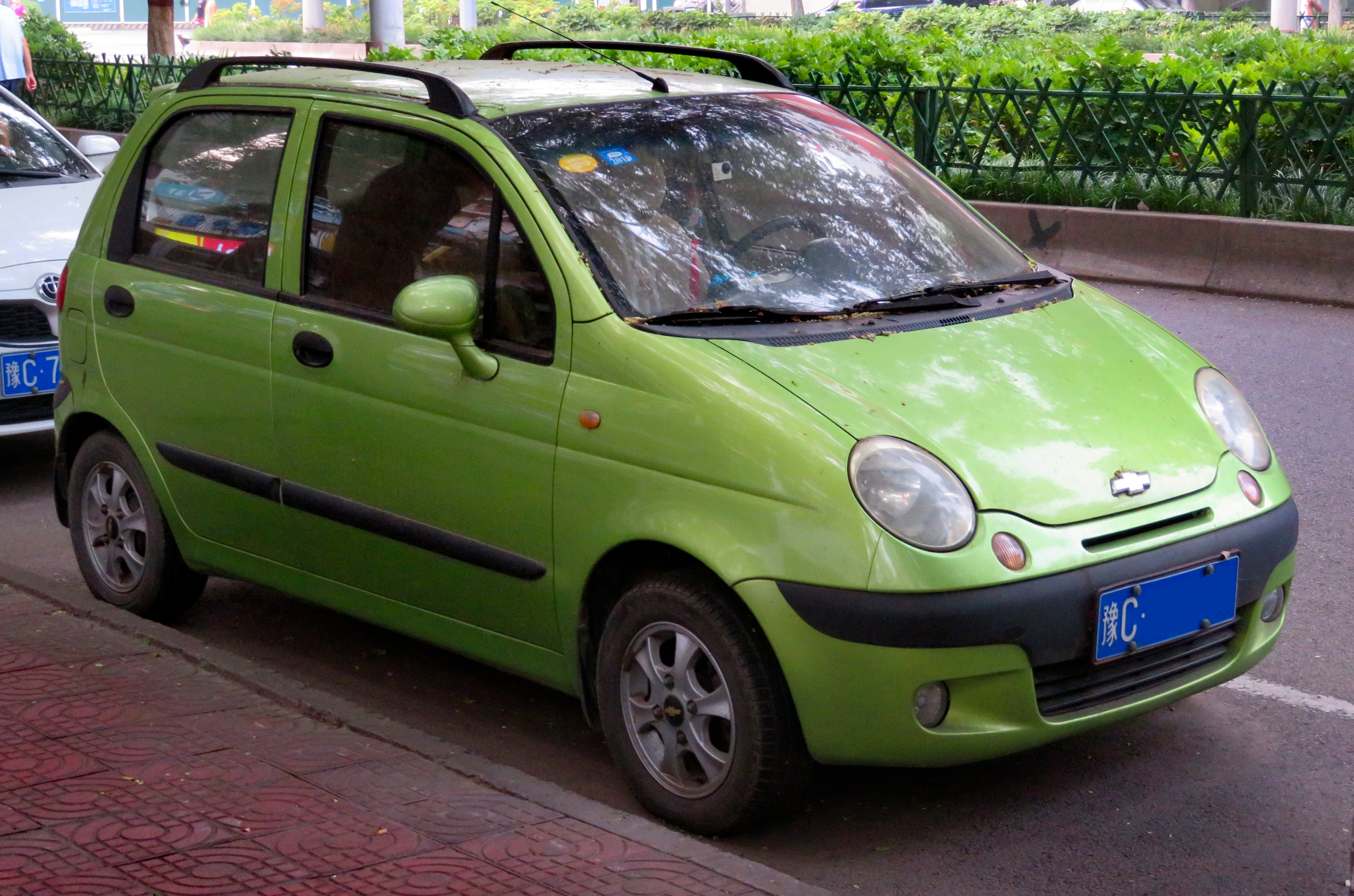
2007 Chevrolet Lechi

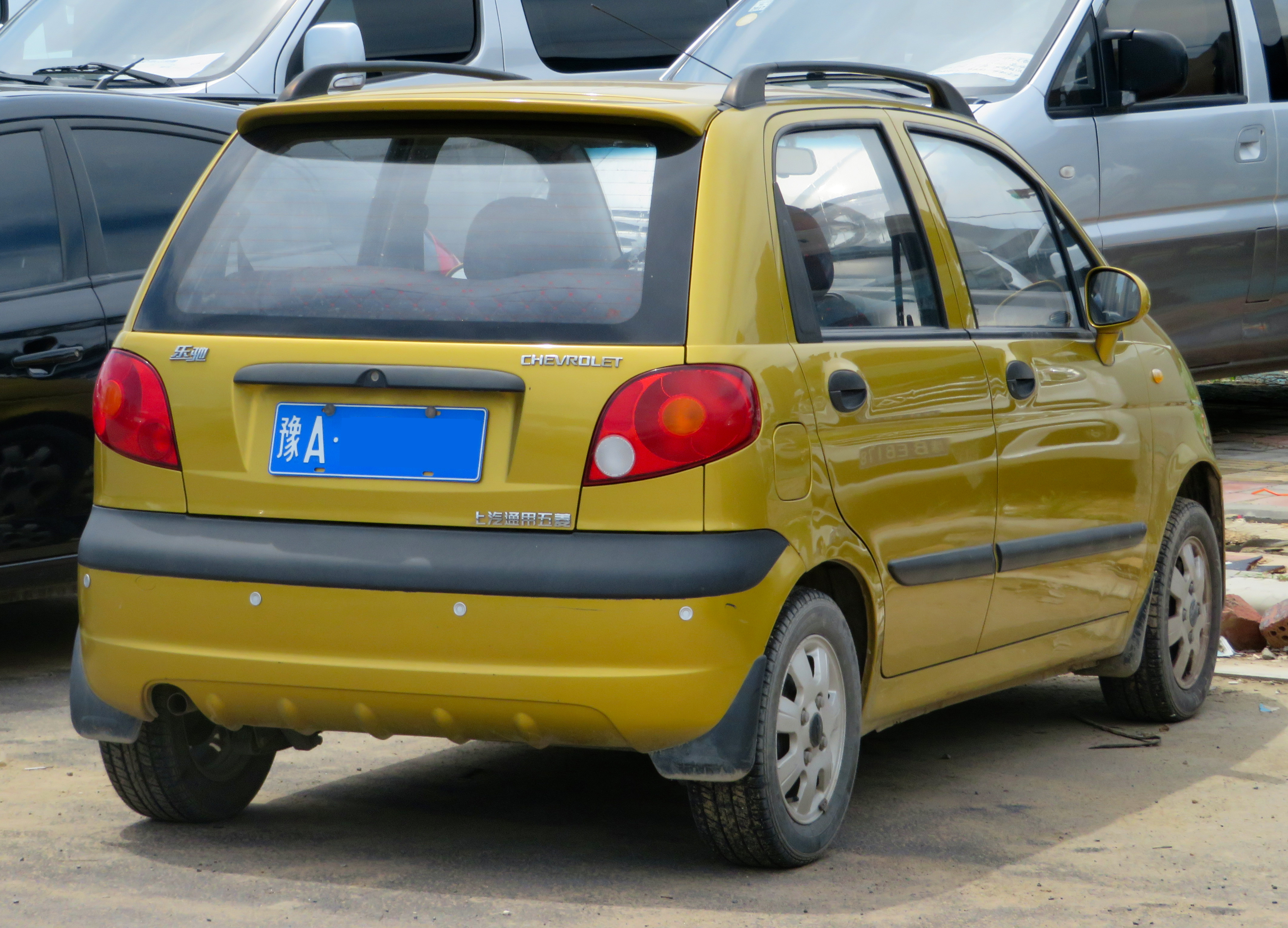
2009 Chevrolet Lechi

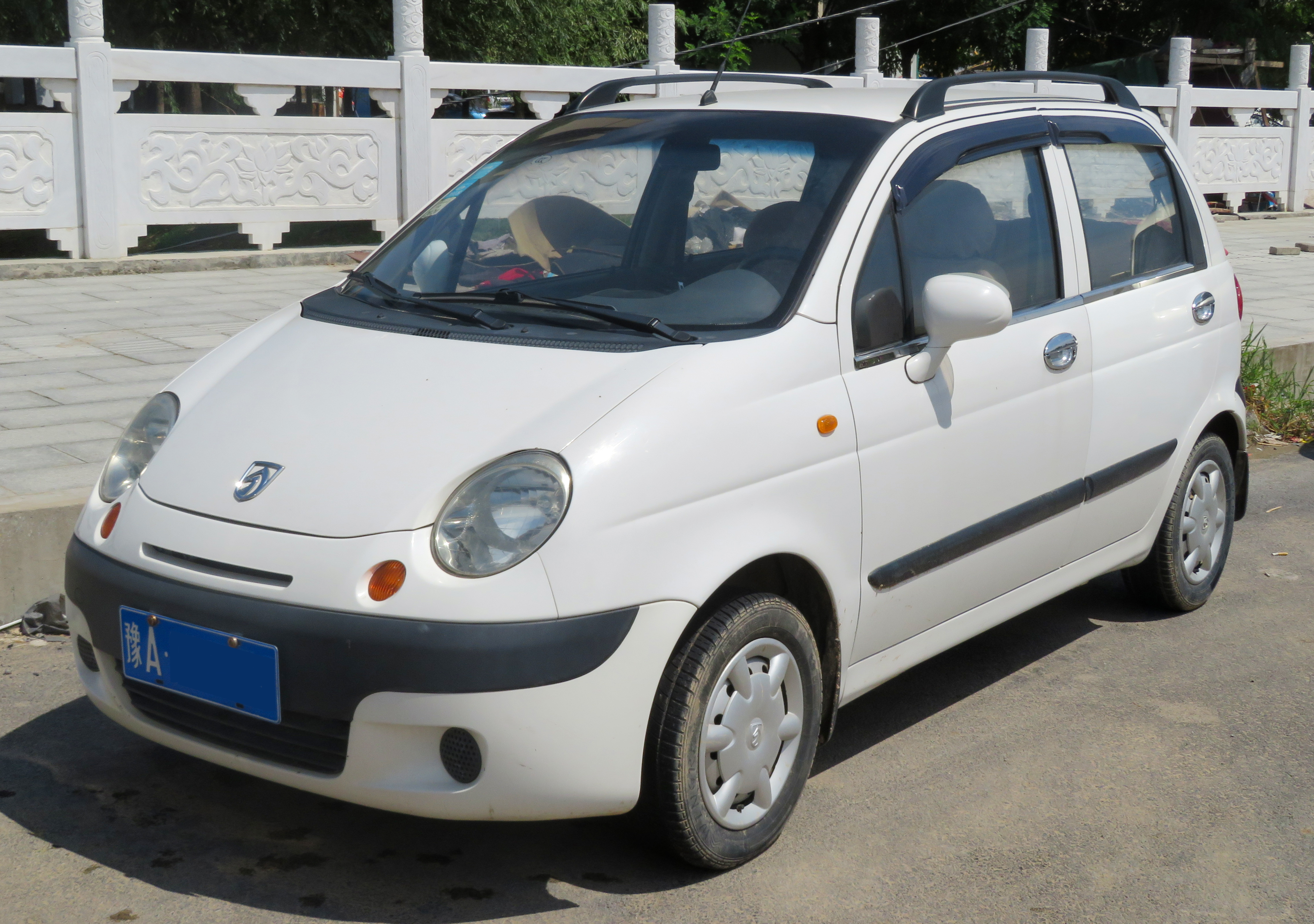
2014 Baojun Lechi

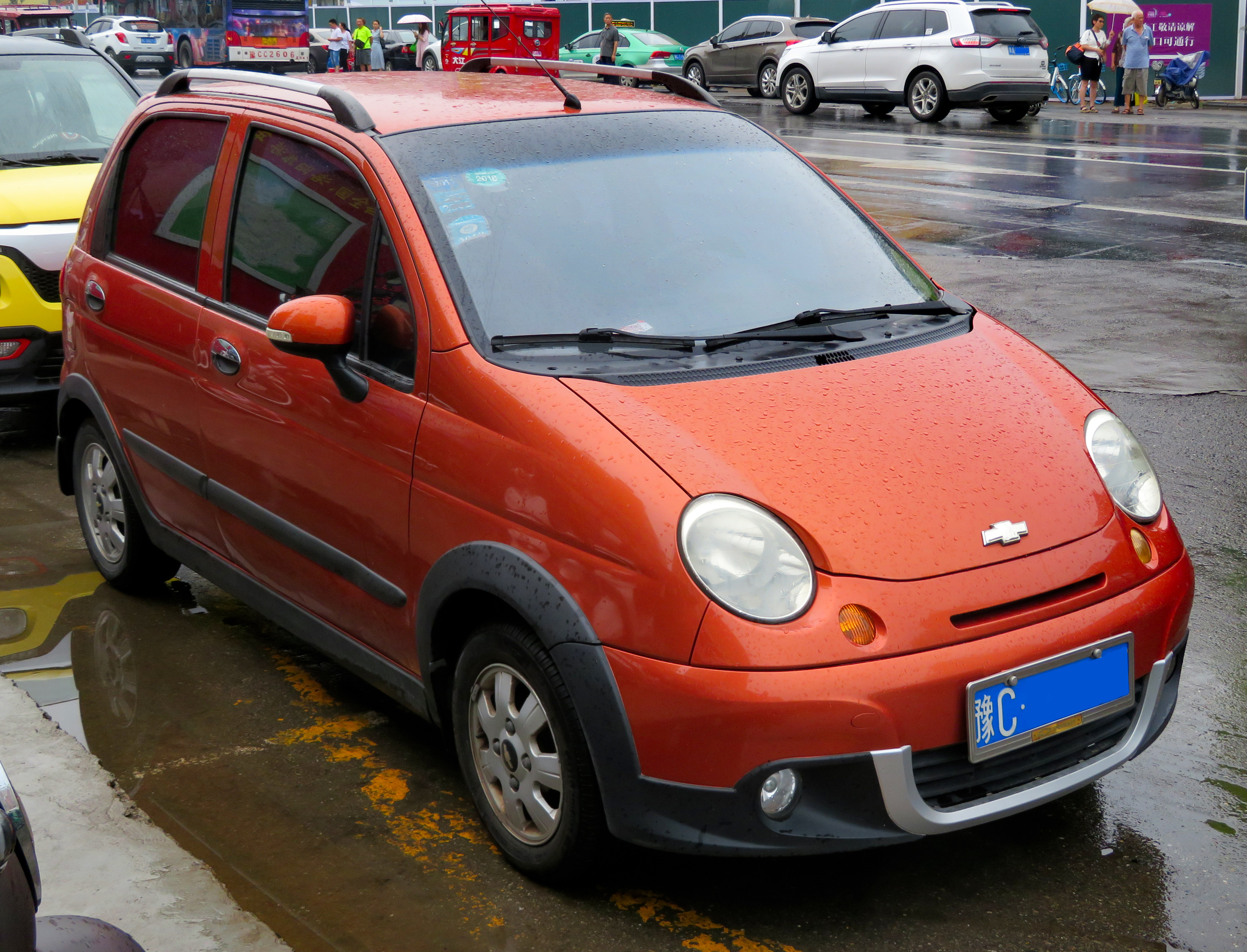
2010 Chevrolet Lechi Cross

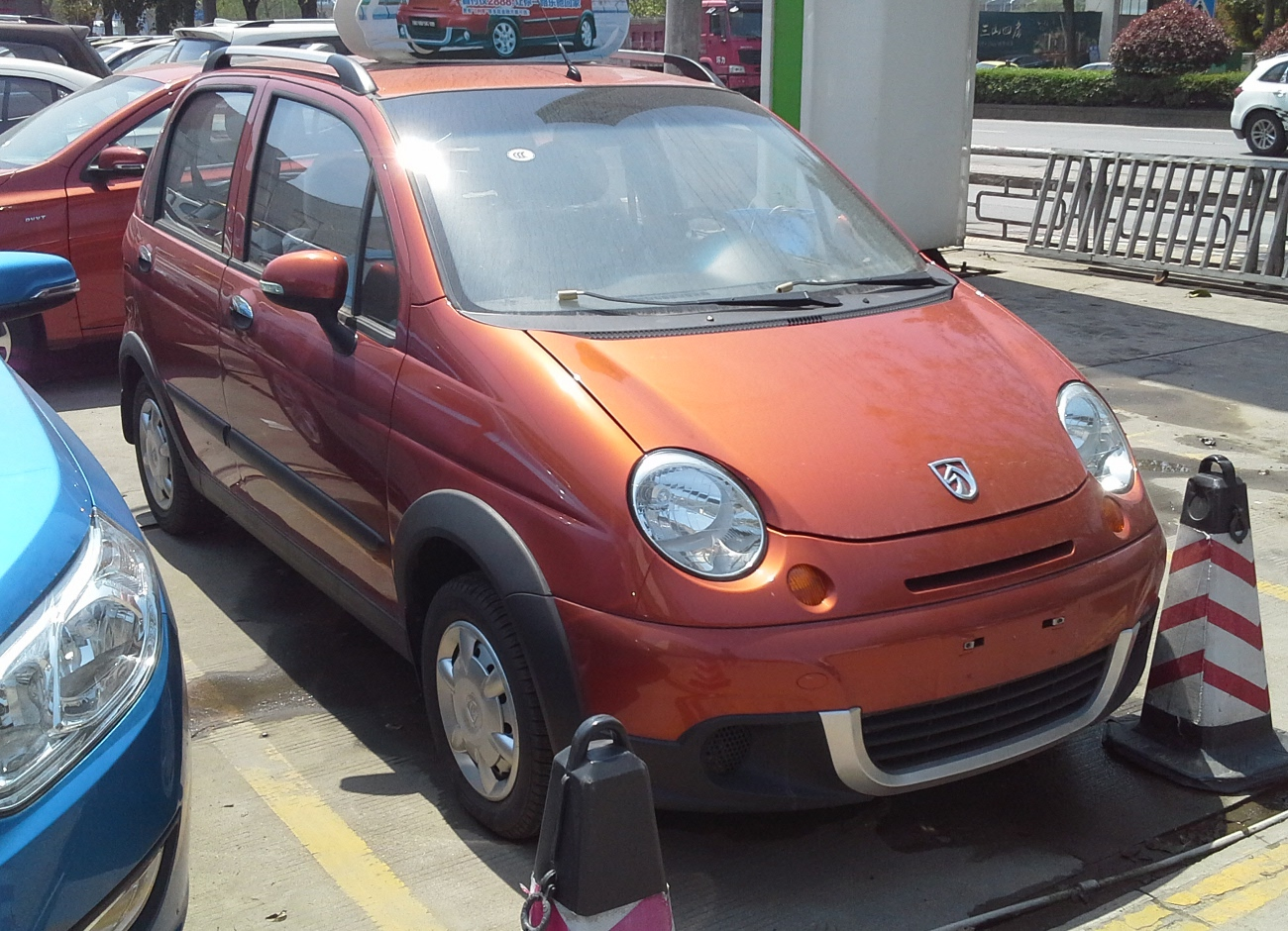
2015 Baojun Lechi Cross

=== Safety ===
Euro NCAP test results for a RHD, five-door hatchback variant on a 2000 registration:

Test	Score	Points
Overall:	N/A	N/A
Adult occupant:	3/5 stars	19
Child occupant:	N/A	N/A
Pedestrian:	2/4 stars	15
Safety assist:	N/A	N/A

=== Engines ===
It featured a range of three petrol engines which had these specifications:

Model	Engine	Displacement	Power	Torque	0–100 km/h (0-62 mph)	Top speed	CO_{2} emissions	Notes
0.8	I3	796 cc	51 PS (38 kW; 50 hp)	69 N⋅m (51 lb⋅ft) at 4,200 rpm	17.0 s	144 km/h (89 mph)	161 g/km	
1.0	I4	995 cc	63 PS (46 kW; 62 hp)	87 N⋅m (64 lb⋅ft) at 4,300 rpm	14.2 s	155 km/h (96 mph)	157 g/km	introduced in 2002
1.2	I4	1,206 cc	86 PS (63 kW; 85 hp)	108 N⋅m (80 lb⋅ft) at 4,000 rpm	13.9 s	160 km/h (99 mph)	180 g/km	China, from 2009

=== Copying controversy ===
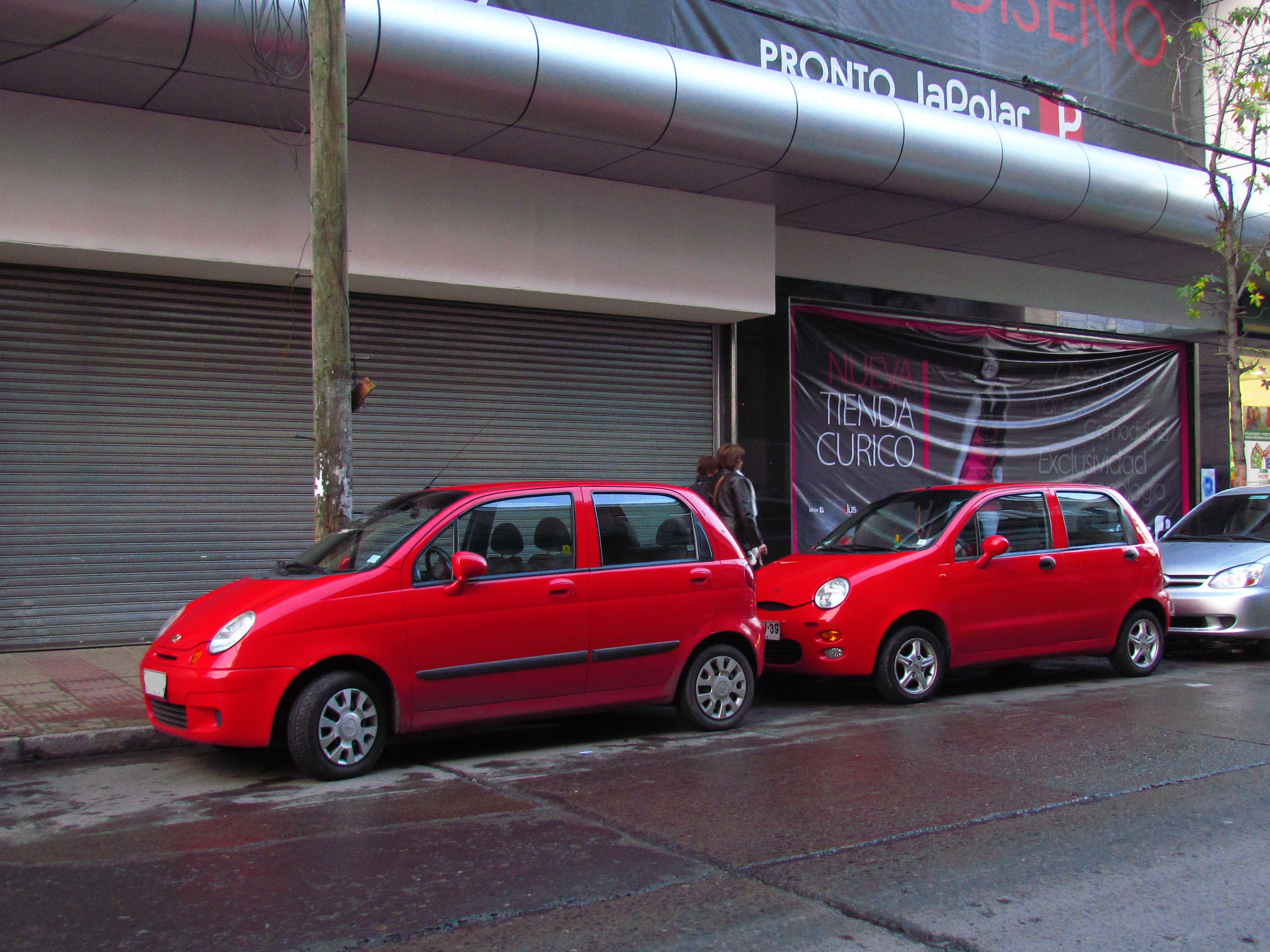
The Chevrolet Matiz/Spark (left) and the Chery QQ (right): The design of QQ is a copy of the original Matiz/Spark.

The Chery QQ3, then known as the Chery QQ, became the center of an industrial copyright and intellectual rights controversy, as GM claimed the car was a copy of the Daewoo Matiz. GM executives demonstrated the extent of the design duplication, noting for example that the doors of the QQ and those of the Spark are interchangeable without modification.

GM China Group indicated the two vehicles "shared remarkably identical body structure, exterior design, interior design, and key components" MotorAuthority.com and Car and Driver called the QQ a "carbon copy", while the International Herald Tribune, in a 2005 article, referred to it as a clone.

The Detroit News reported that "the dispute reflects the confusion, risks, and ambitions in China's new auto industry, where global carmakers are battling pugnacious upstarts for a piece of what may become the world's largest auto market."

== Second generation (M200, M250; 2005) ==
Second generation
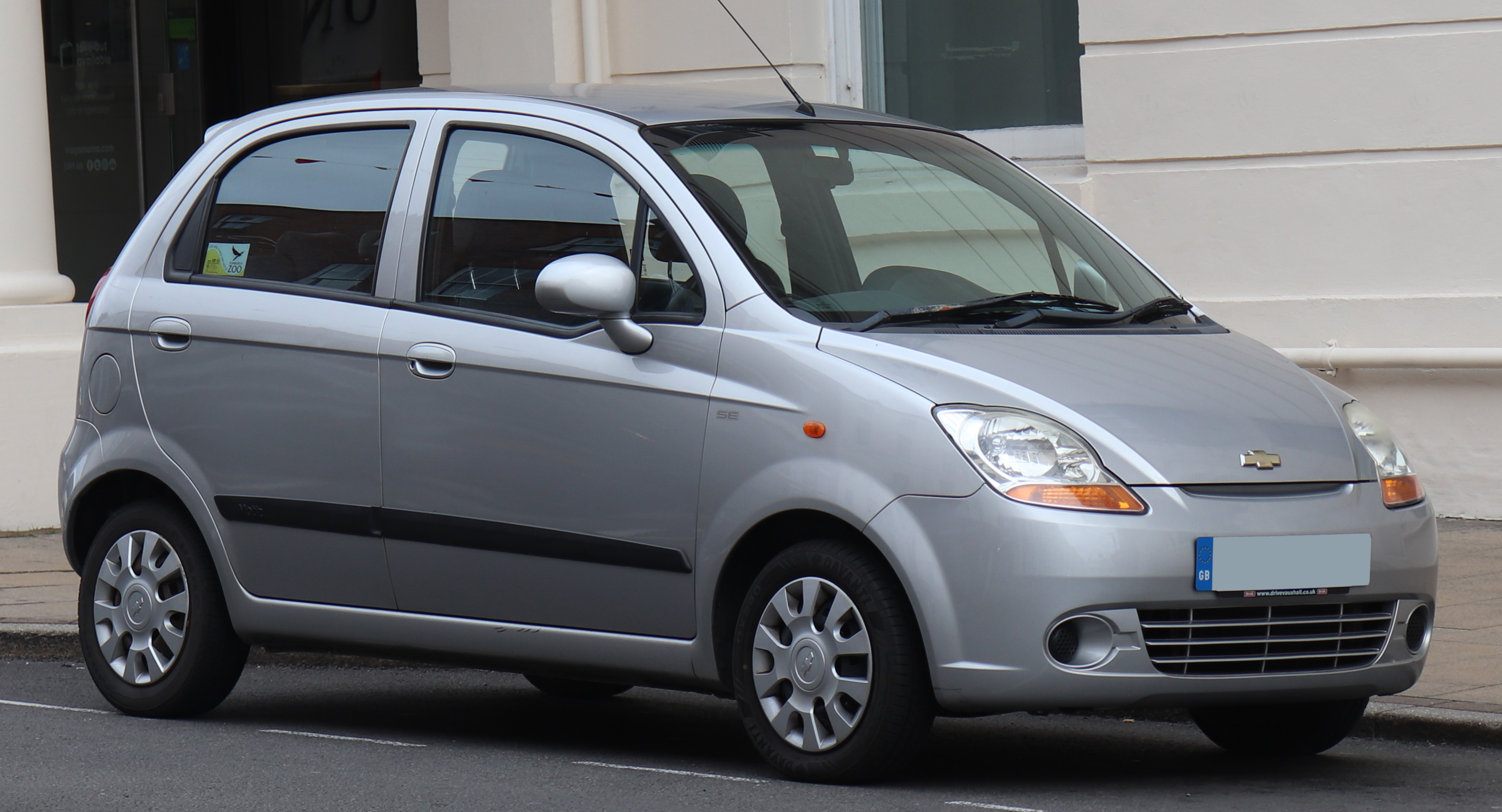
- Chevrolet Matiz (M200)

Overview
- Model code: M200; M250
- Also called: Daewoo Matiz (South Korea); Chevrolet Matiz; Matiz G2 (México); Pontiac Matiz (México); FSO Matiz (Poland); Chevrolet Joy (Pakistan); Chevrolet Taxi 7:24 Chronos; Chevrolet Chevytaxi (Colombia)
- Production: 2005–2009 (South Korea); 2007–2017 (India); 2006–2009 (Pakistan); 2006–2016 (Latin America)
- Assembly: South Korea: Changwon; Colombia: Bogotá (GM Colombia); India: Halol, Gujarat (GM India); Pakistan: Karachi (Nexus Automotive); Vietnam: Hanoi (VIDAMCO)
- Designer: Giorgetto Giugiaro

Body and chassis
- Body style: 5-door hatchback

Powertrain
- Engine: Petrol: 0.8 L S-TEC I3; 1.0 L S-TEC I4
- Transmission: 5-speed manual; 4-speed automatic

Dimensions
- Wheelbase: 2,345 mm (92.3 in)
- Length: 3,495 mm (137.6 in)
- Width: 1,495 mm (58.9 in)
- Height: 1,500 mm (59.1 in)

In 2005, the Matiz received substantial modifications (M200), previewed by the Chevrolet M3X concept car shown at 2004 Paris Motor Show. The upper body was revised, based again on a design by Italdesign Giugiaro, the S-Tec engines were updated, and the car's drag coefficient was lowered, resulting in better fuel economy. The interior was also significantly revised, notably with a centre-mounted instrument cluster. The platform was also revised, with a twist-beam rear suspension system replacing the previous three-link beam axle, and the front suspension using cast, rather than pressed and fabricated lower control arms.

In 2008, the 800 cc engine was revised to fall below the 120 g/km level, thus qualifying for the UK's £35 road tax band and no London congestion charge.

In Europe, it was marketed under the names Chevrolet Matiz and Chevrolet Spark. In Italy, the LPG version was called Chevrolet Matiz Eco Logic; it was built from 2007 to 2010 in over 60,000 vehicles by BRC Gas Equipment in Cherasco, Cuneo, Italy.

In South Korea, where it was marketed only with an 800 cc engine and following the introduction of M300 Matiz (Matiz Creative), the M200 Matiz was renamed to Matiz Classic Production reach 2.3 million worldwide during the first 10 years.

As of 2011, VIDAMCO of Vietnam produces the Matiz M200 as the Chevrolet Spark Lite in complete knock-down (CKD) form at its Hanoi production facility.

In India, the local manufacturer GM India produced two special editions of this generation - the Chevrolet Spark LPG, a version equipped with a sequential injection-type liquified petroleum gas kit, unveiled on the World Environment Day in New Delhi, and the Chevrolet Spark Muzic, introduced in 2009.

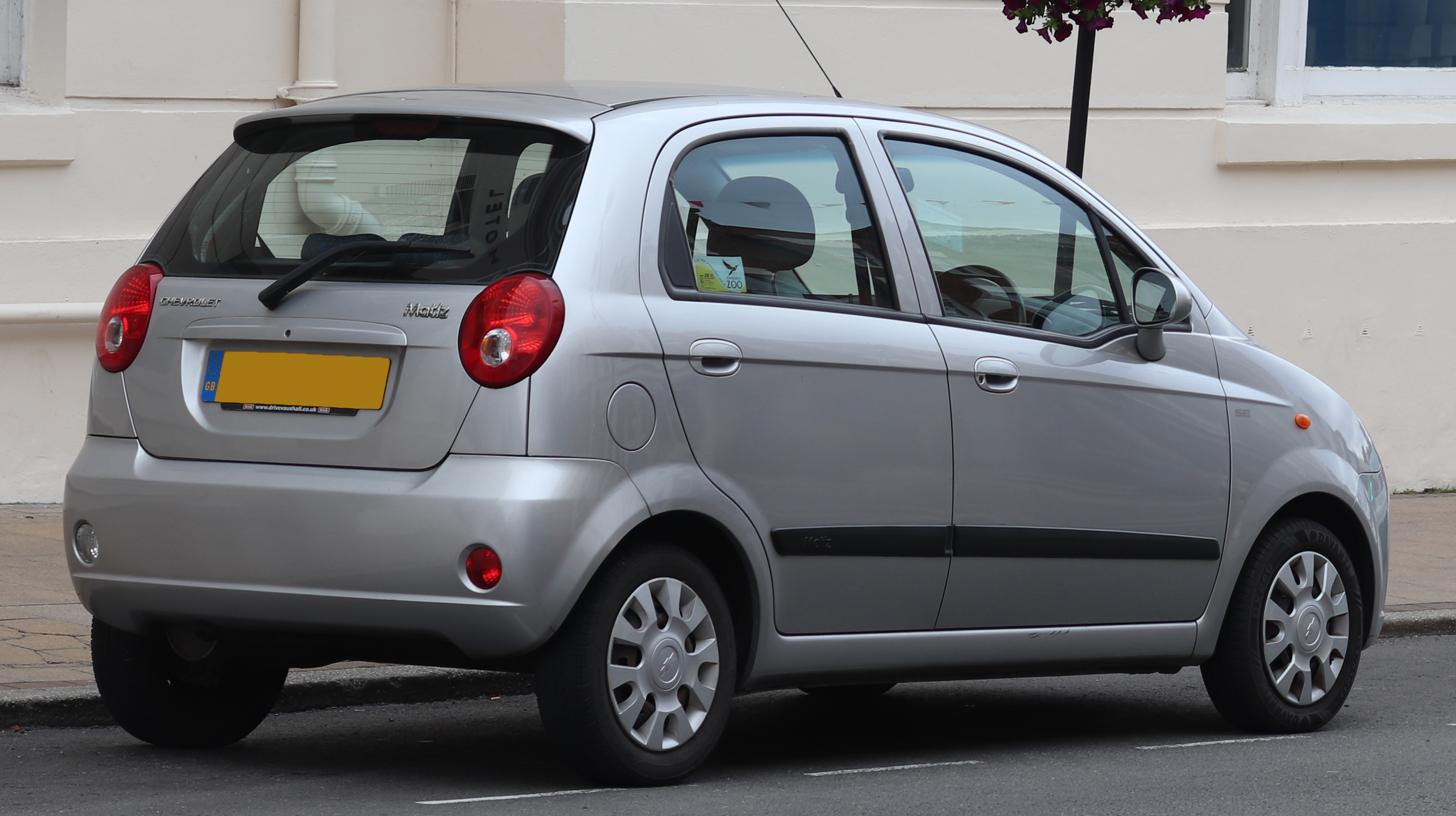
Chevrolet Matiz (M200; UK)

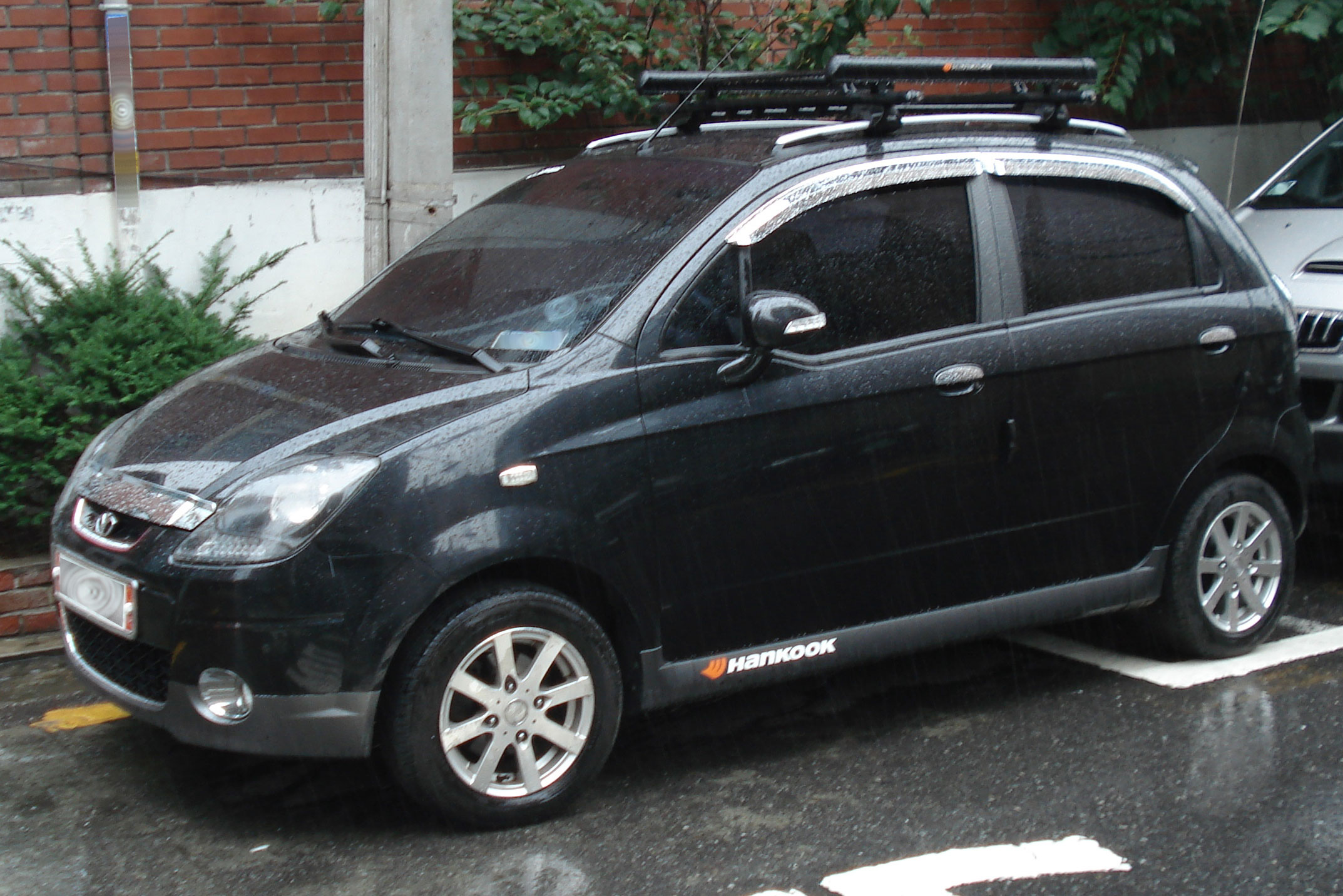
Daewoo Matiz M250

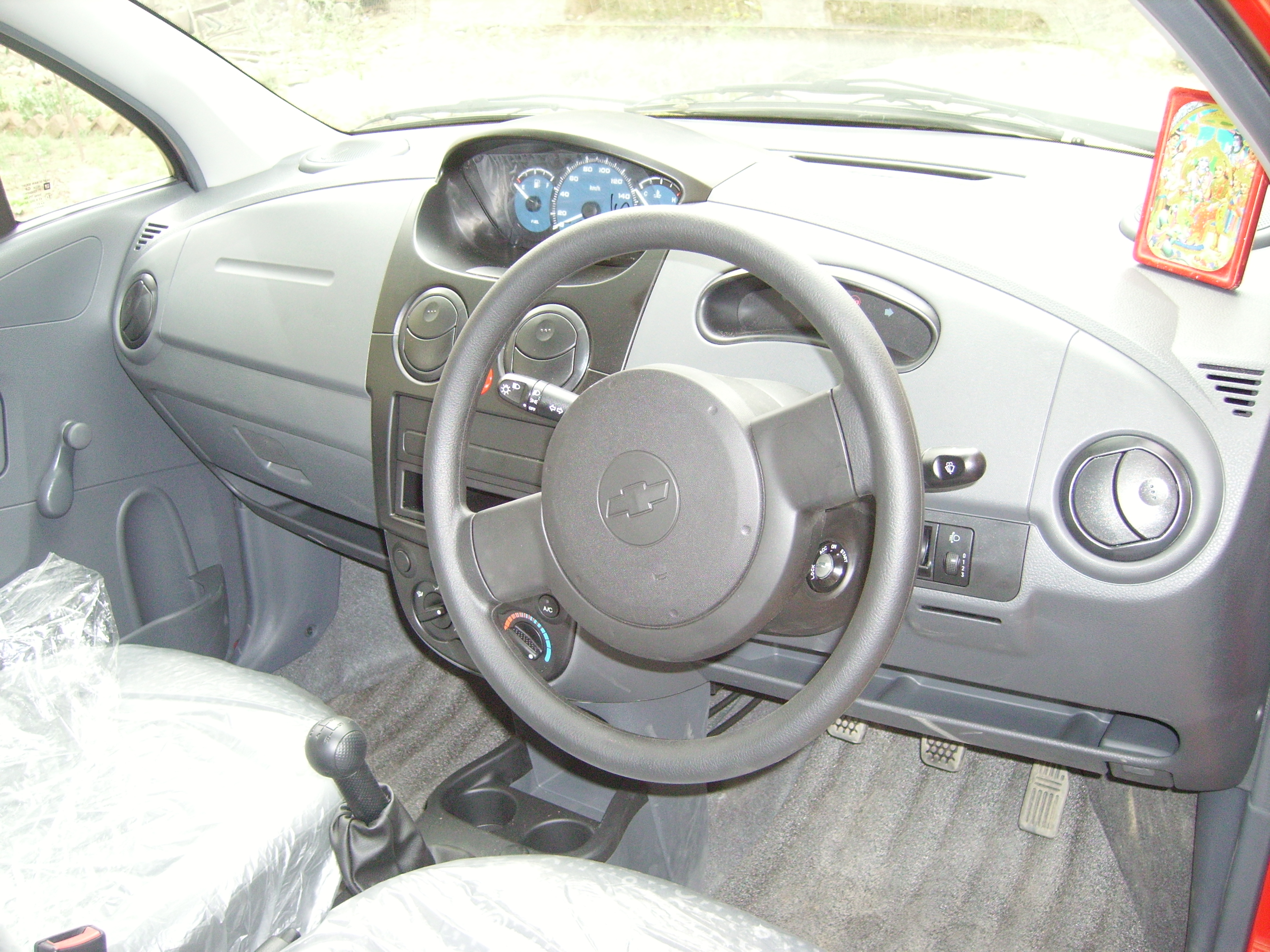
Interior view with the centrally mounted dashboard console

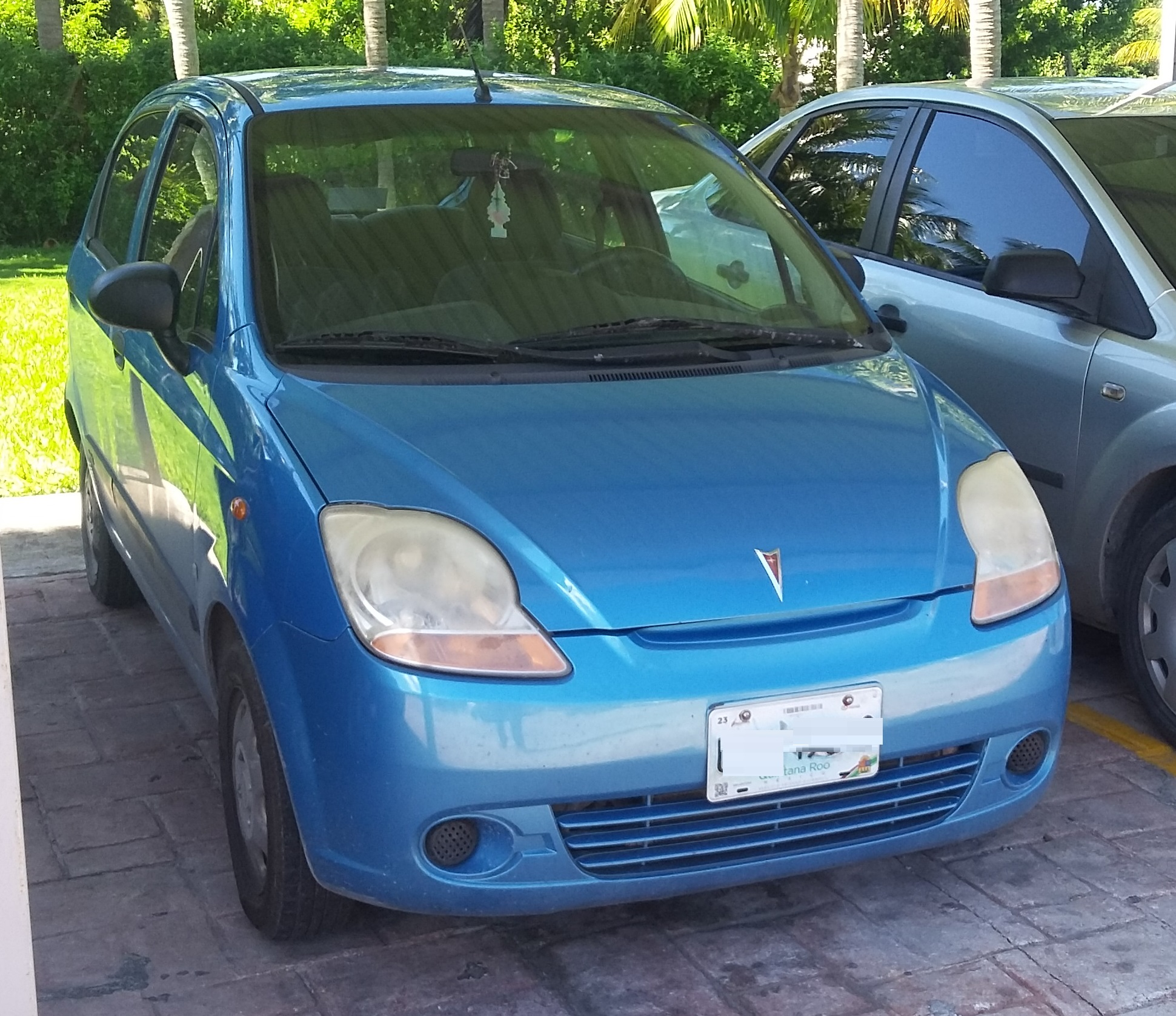
Pontiac G2 Matiz

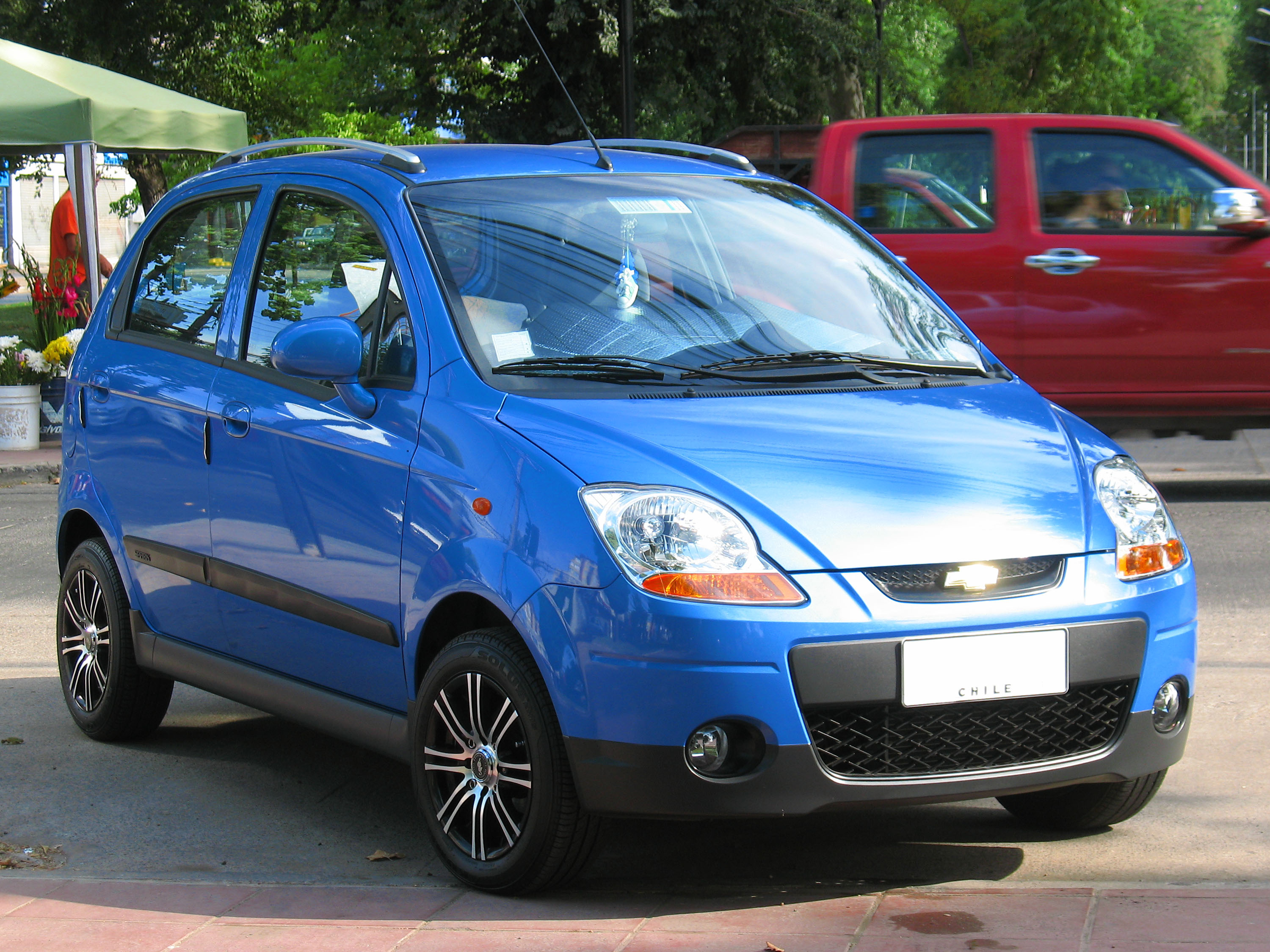
2013 Chevrolet Spark Lite (M250; Chile)

=== Safety ===
Euro NCAP test results for a five-door hatchback variant on a 2005 registration:

Test	Score	Points
Overall:	N/A	N/A
Adult occupant:	2.5/5 stars	17
Child occupant:	3/5 stars	30
Pedestrian:	2/4 stars	13
Safety assist:	N/A	N/A

=== Engines ===
Model	Engine	Displacement	Power	Torque	0–100 km/h (0-62 mph)	Top speed	CO_{2} emissions	Notes
0.8	I3	796 cc	52 PS (38 kW; 51 hp)	72 N⋅m (53 lb⋅ft) at 4,400 rpm	18.2 s	145 km/h (90 mph)	123 g/km	
1.0	I4	995 cc	66 PS (49 kW; 65 hp)	91 N⋅m (67 lb⋅ft) at 4,200 rpm	14.1 s	156 km/h (97 mph)	133 g/km	

== Third generation (M300; 2009) ==
Third generation
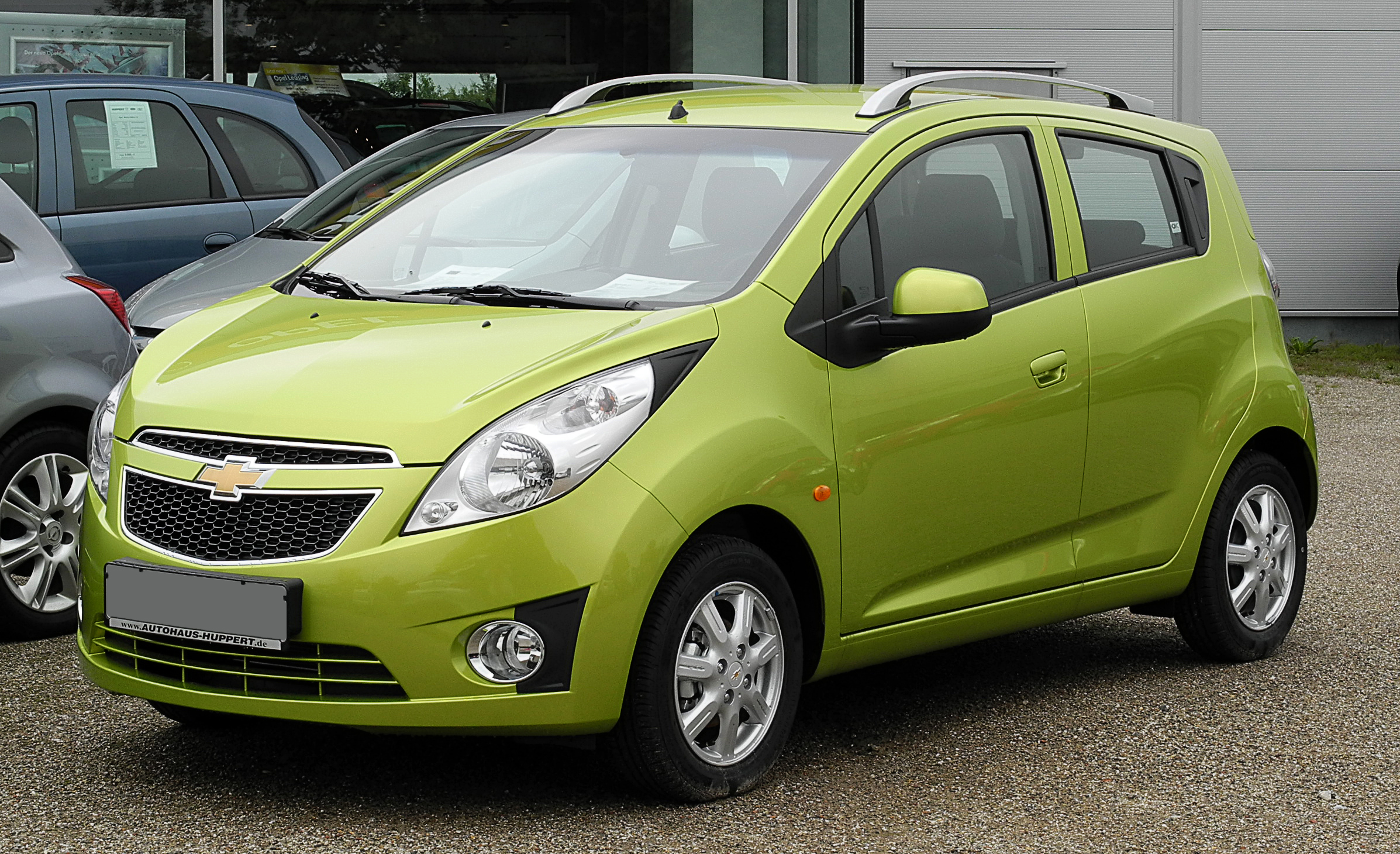

Overview
- Model code: M300
- Also called: Daewoo Matiz Creative (South Korea, 2009–2011); Chevrolet Beat (India and Latin America); Chevrolet ChevyTaxi Plus (Taxi version, Colombia); Holden Barina Spark (Australasia); Ravon R2 (CIS members, Ukraine)
- Production: 2009–2015 (South Korea); 2009–2023 (Uzbekistan); 2010–2020 (India); 2010–2021 (Colombia; hatchback); 2018–2022 (Colombia; ChevyTaxi Plus)
- Model years: 2013–2015 (North America)
- Assembly: South Korea: Changwon (GM Korea); India: Talegaon (GM India); South Africa: Port Elizabeth (GM South Africa); Colombia: Bogotá (GM Colombia); Uzbekistan: Asaka (GM Uzbekistan/UzAuto Motors); Vietnam: Hanoi (GM Vietnam)
- Designer: Taewan Kim

Body and chassis
- Body style: 4-door notchback; 5-door hatchback
- Platform: Gamma II
- Related: Opel Agila B Suzuki Splash

Powertrain
- Engine: Petrol: 995 cc S-TEC II I4; 1,199 cc S-TEC II I4 (Note: Available in India only.); 1,206 cc S-TEC II I4; 1,249 cc S-TEC II I4 (Note: Available in the United States only.); LPG: 1,199 cc S-TEC II I4; Diesel: 936 cc XSDE I3
- Transmission: 5-speed Y4M HD manual; 4-speed Aisin AW 80-40LE automatic; CVT Jatco M4M-CVT7 automatic

Dimensions
- Wheelbase: 2,375 mm (93.5 in)
- Length: 3,640–3,675 mm (143.3–144.7 in); 3,995 mm (157.3 in) (notchback)
- Width: 1,597 mm (62.9 in)
- Height: 1,549–1,551 mm (61.0–61.1 in)
- Curb weight: 1,070–1,090 kg (2,350–2,400 lb)

The redesigned Matiz (codenamed M300) was launched in 2009 and is based on the 2007 Chevrolet Beat concept car. Although sold globally as the Chevrolet Spark, in India, this model retains the Beat name from the concept car, as the second-generation Spark continues to be sold in this market. In some Latin American markets, the Beat name was also used, while Chile, Colombia, Ecuador, Mexico, and Peru received it as the Spark GT. Prior to the 2011 elimination of the Daewoo marque in South Korea, the third-generation Spark was marketed as the Daewoo Matiz Creative.

GM presented a pre-production version of the Chevrolet Beat carrying the Chevrolet Spark nameplate at the 2009 North American International Auto Show. The production version was announced at that show, but only the Beat concept was shown.

The production Chevrolet Spark was unveiled at the 2009 Geneva Motor Show. It became available in Europe in the first quarter of 2010, followed by other markets worldwide, with US sales set to begin in early 2012 for 2013 model year. Production of the car started from December 2009 in Halol, Gujarat, India. It was launched in India in January 2010 as the Chevrolet Beat during Auto Expo in New Delhi.

With the M300, the original Suzuki platform was replaced by GM Global Small Vehicles platform, developed by GM Daewoo engineers.

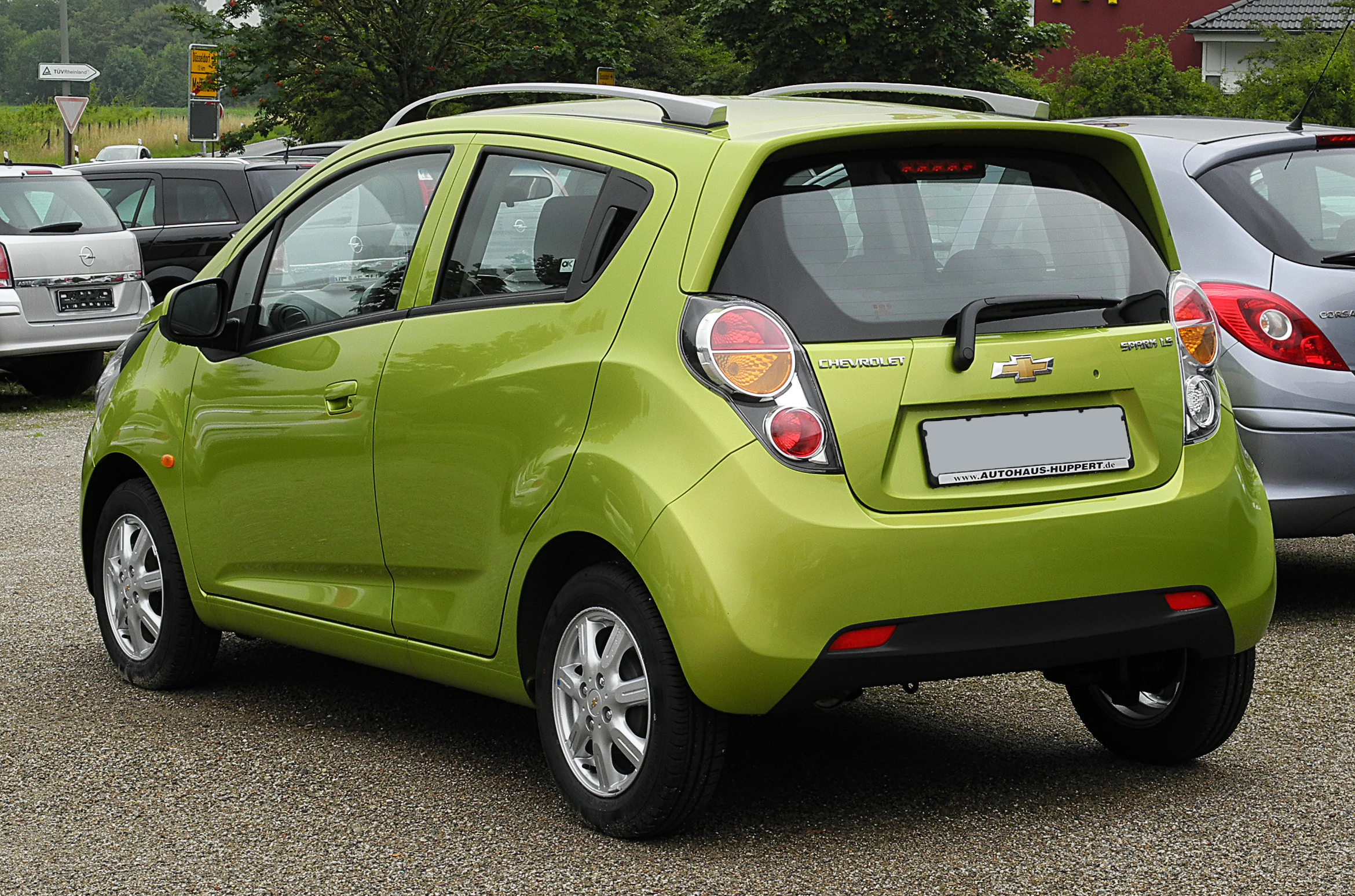
Pre-facelift (Europe)

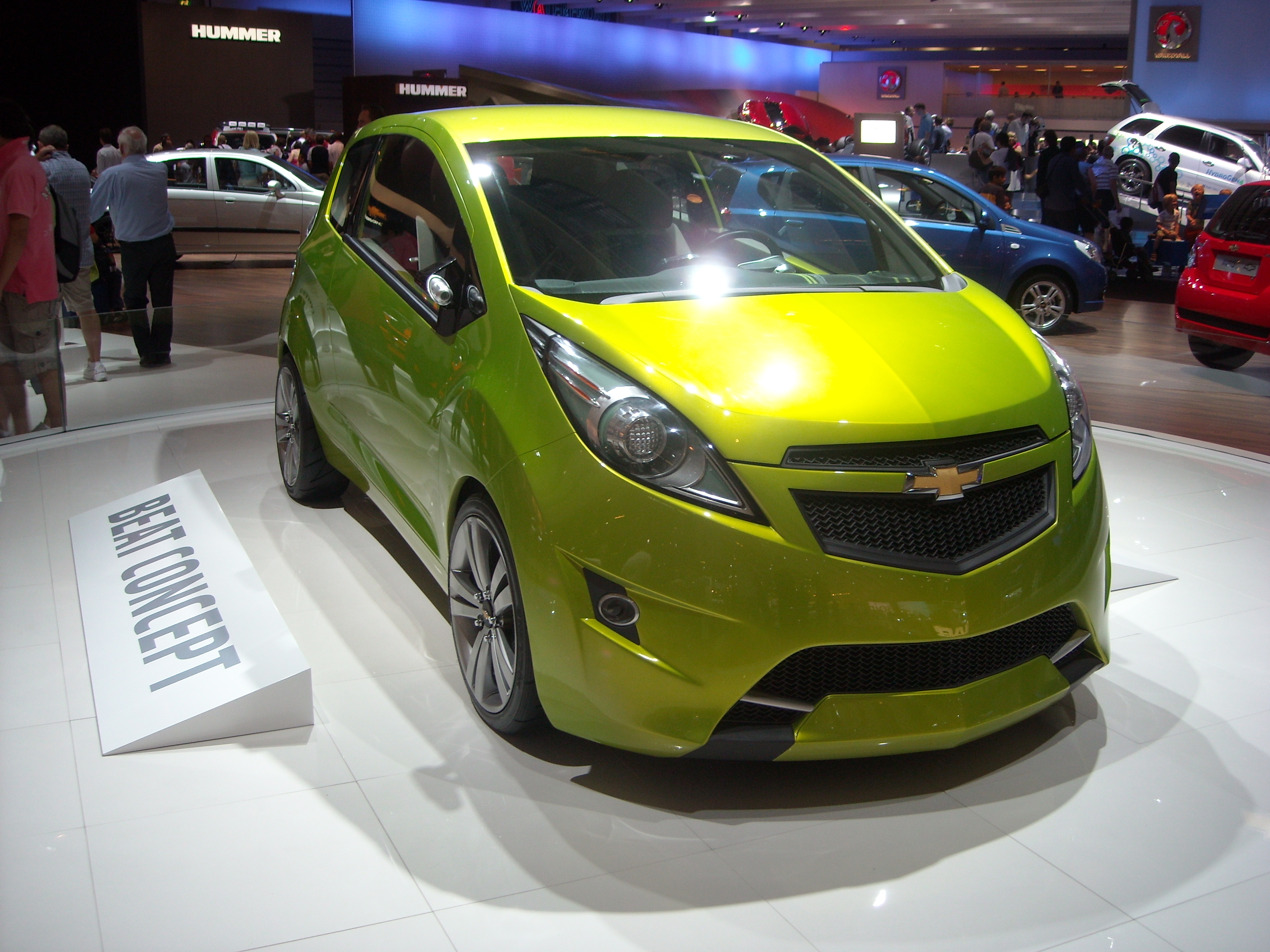
Chevrolet Beat concept

=== Concept ===
The Chevrolet Beat concept car was unveiled at the 2007 New York International Auto Show alongside two other concept vehicles, the Trax and the Groove. The Beat is a three-door hatchback concept, derived from the Daewoo Kalos. It was designed by GM Daewoo in South Korea. It is powered by a 1.2 L turbocharged gasoline engine mated to an automatic transmission.

In early 2007, GM conducted a poll testing the relative popularity of the Beat, Trax, and Groove concepts on a Chevrolet website, with the Beat receiving nearly 50% of the vote, which ultimately determined the car making it into production.

GM displayed a prototype woodie version of the forthcoming Chevrolet Spark for the 2010 Paris Motor Show.

This version was used as Skids vehicle mode in the 2009 film Transformers: Revenge of the Fallen alongside the Trax. The car sports a Vertigo Green exterior paint job with the same hue carried over to the parts of the interior. Its profile is high at the rear and tapering down evenly to the front of the grille. Headlights that appear to extend all the way from the base of the grille to the base of windshield are LED type. It feature 17-inch wheels with matching green paint of the disc brakes. Twin taillights that extend upward to the back-up lights are also LEDs.

=== Facelifts ===
The first facelift was revealed at the 2012 Paris Motor Show. It features a redesigned dual-port grille and front bumper, and restyled headlamp covers and fog lamps. The North American model, launched for the 2013 model year, uses the facelifted styling. The first facelift model was launched in India in February 2014. The facelifted Holden Barina Spark retained the existing front bumper, with its front grille being redesigned.

A second facelift was launched in 2017 for the 2018 year with a design inspired by the fourth-generation Spark (M400). Produced in India and Colombia, it is aimed mainly to developing countries.

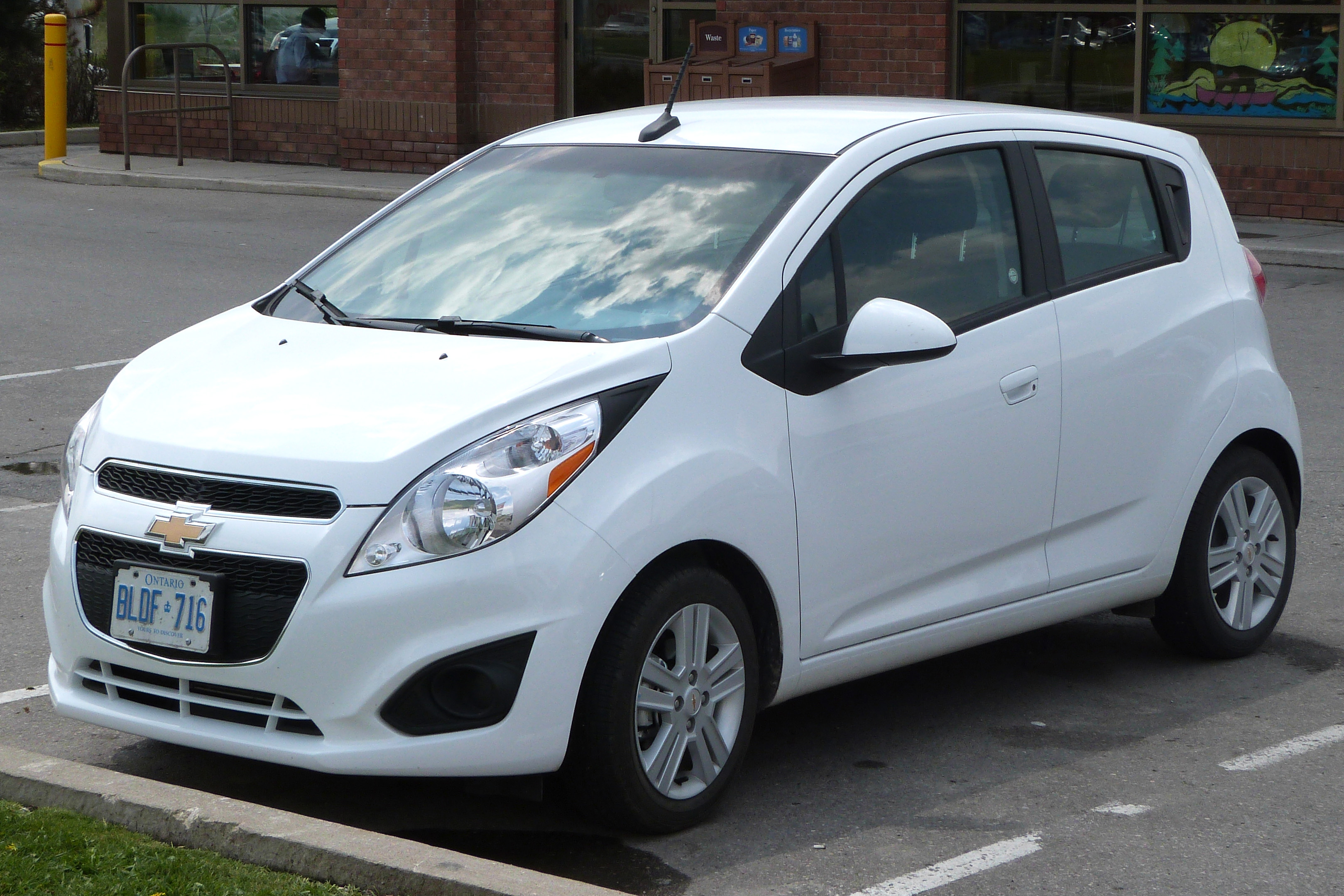
First facelift (North America)

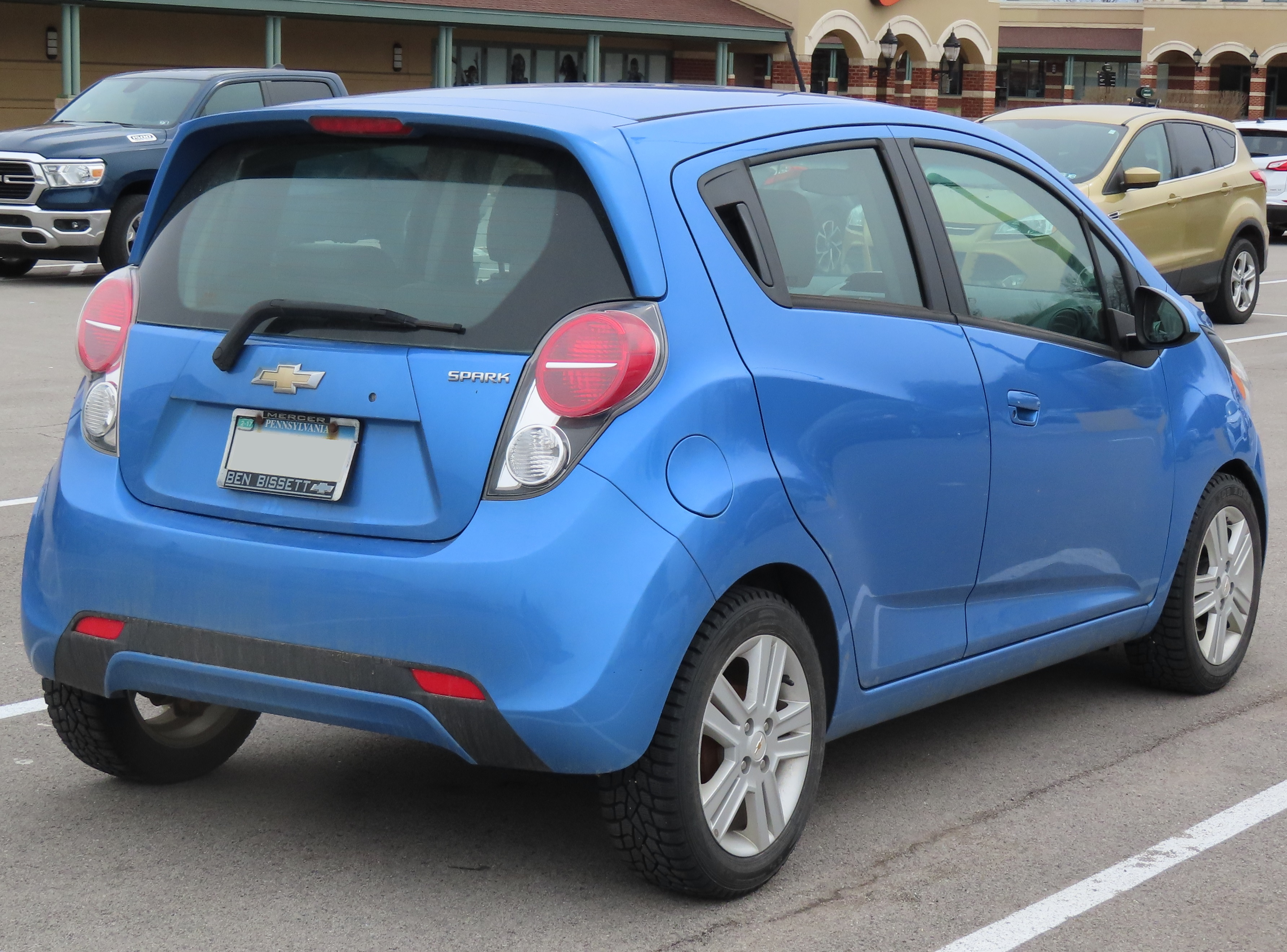
First facelift (North America)

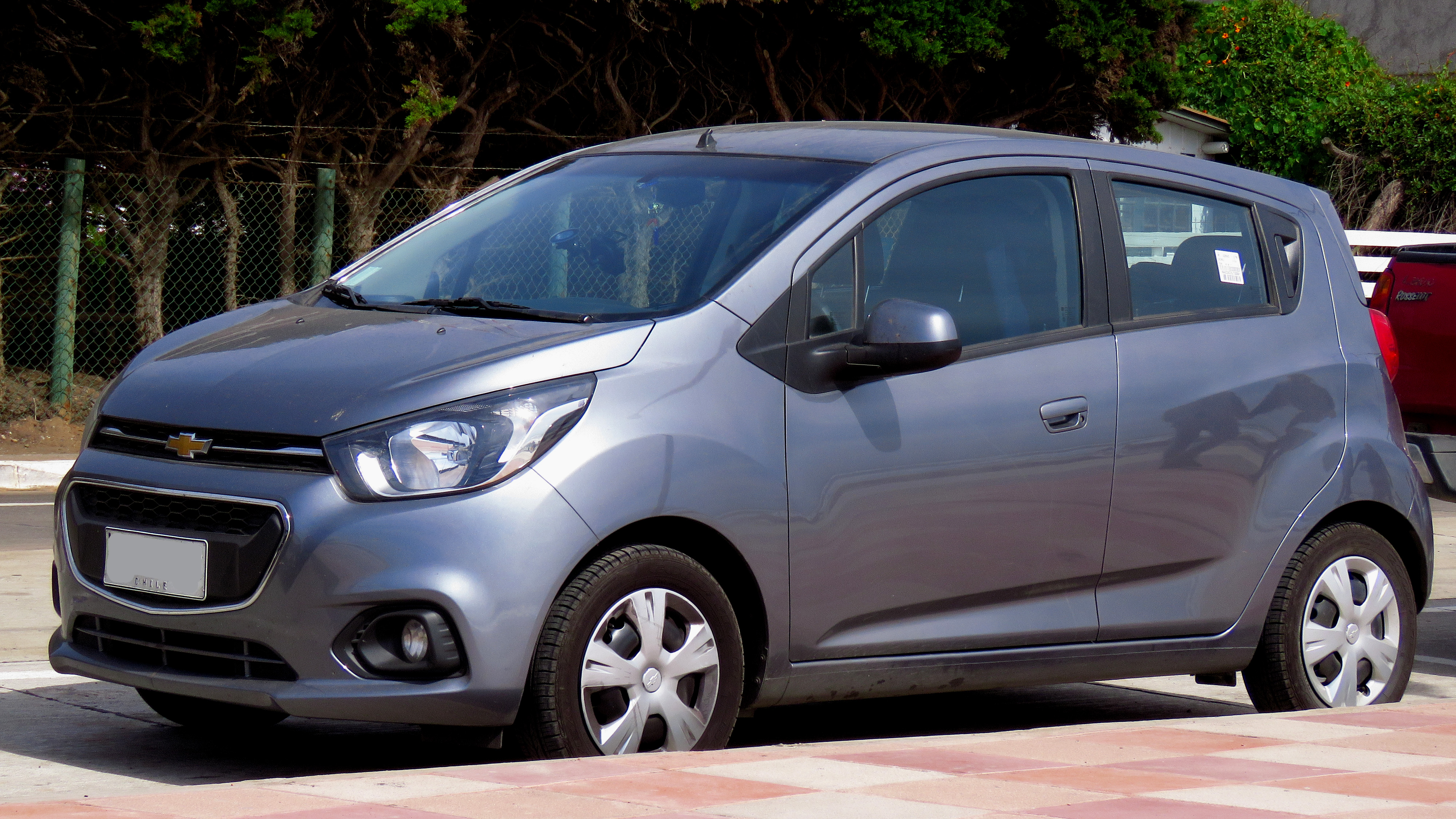
Second facelift (Chile)

=== Beat sedan/notchback (NB) ===
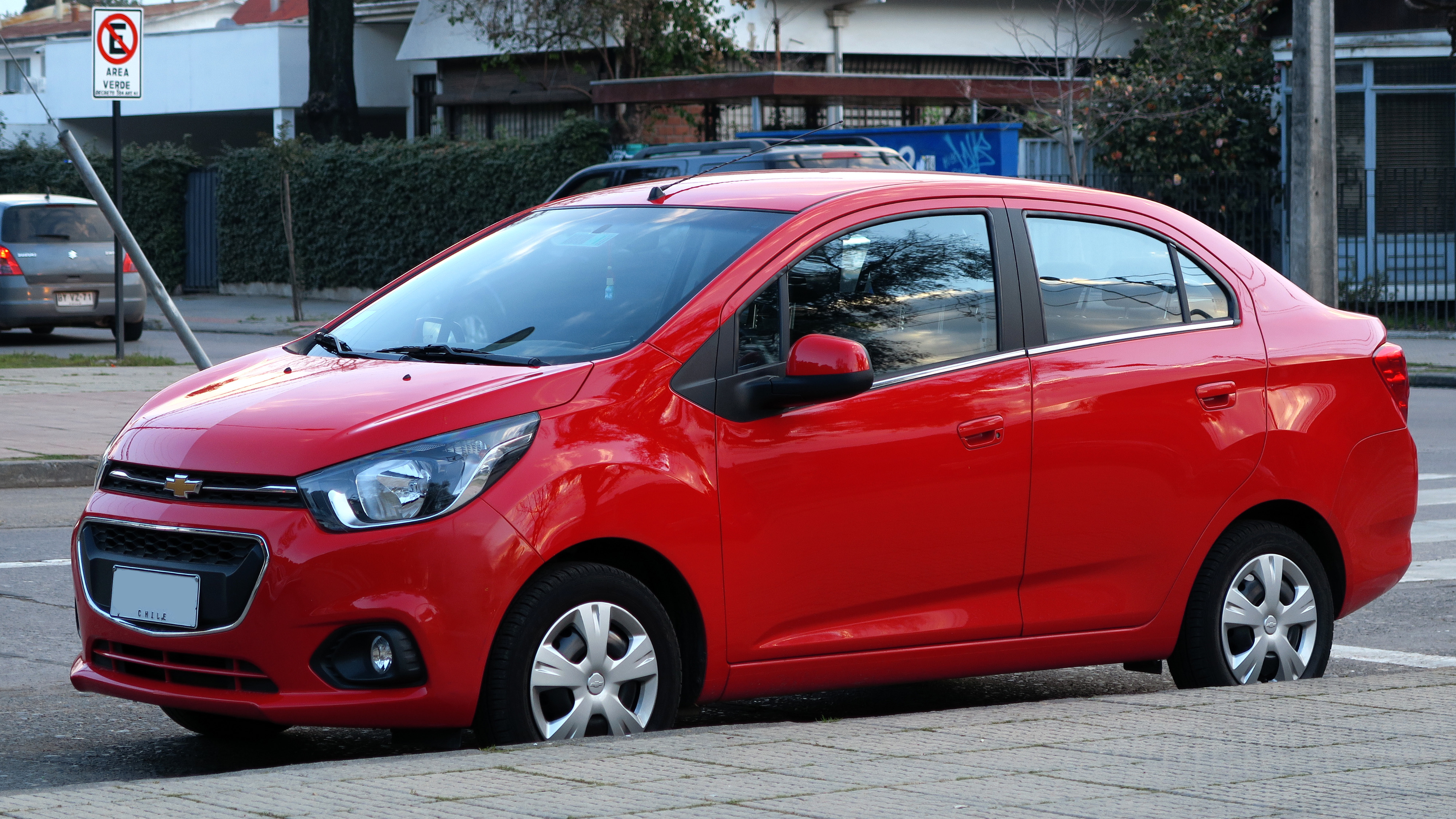
Spark sedan (Chile)

A four-door sedan version was unveiled in a near-production prototype form at the 2016 Auto Expo in India as the Chevrolet Essentia. After GM halted domestic sales in India in 2017, the Essentia was ultimately cancelled for the Indian market. The model was instead exported to Latin America either in finished form or as knock-down kits (to be assembled by GM Colmotores) as the Beat or Beat NB (notchback).

The Beat and its notchback version were discontinued from the Mexican market in early August 2021, giving the production run from 2018 to 2021 model years. The Taxi variant of the Beat Notchback was available for the Colombian market until the 2022 model year.

=== Spark/Beat Activ ===
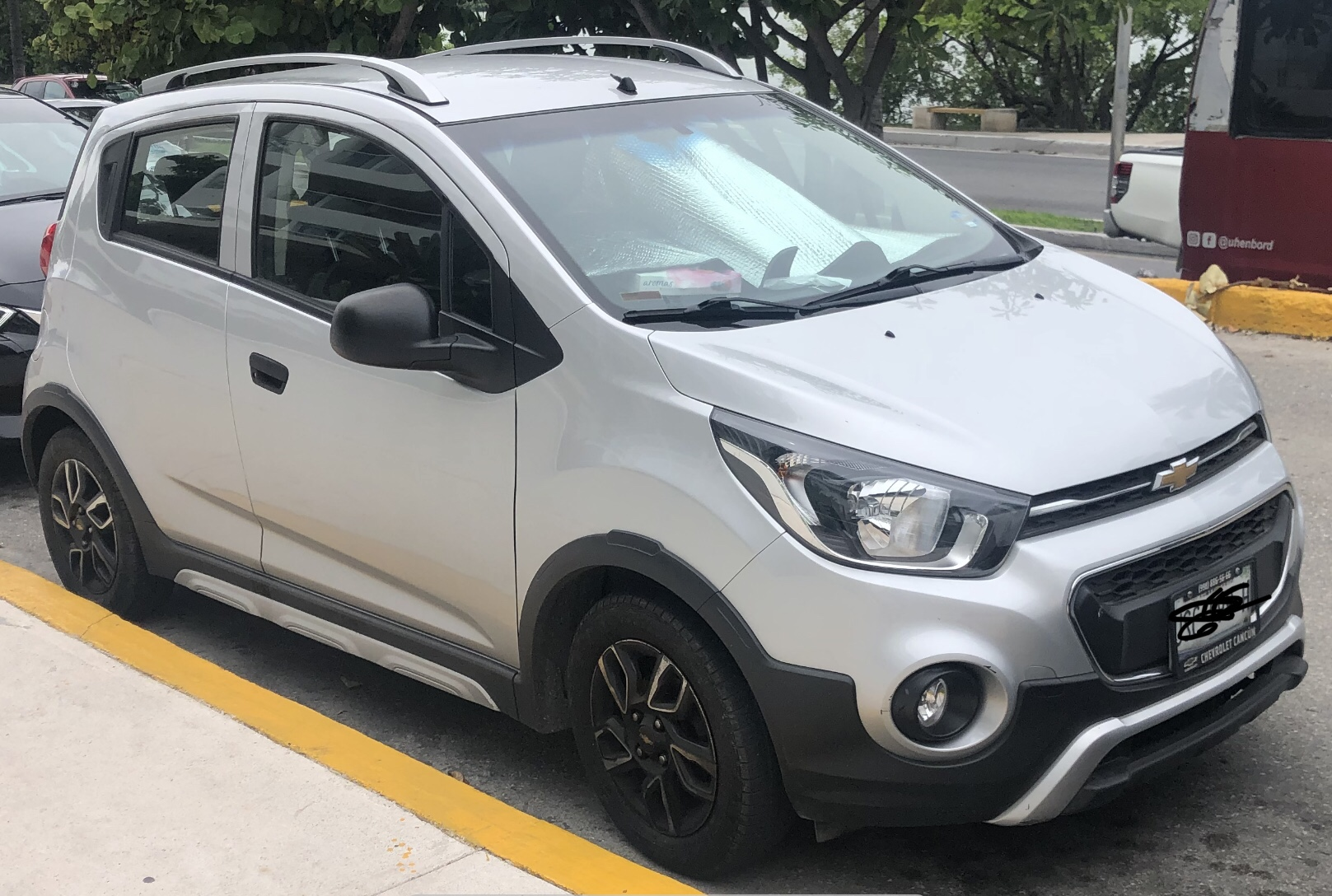
Chevrolet Beat Activ (Mexico)

A crossover-styled version is also available in South America as the Chevrolet Spark GT Activ or Chevrolet Beat Activ. The concept version was showcased at the 2016 Auto Expo in India, however the production version was never sold in India as GM pulled out from the market. The production version is available in several Latin American markets starting from 2018.

=== Markets ===
==== United States ====
The U.S. version of the third-generation Spark went into production on 16 April 2012, and arrived in dealerships in August 2012. Marketed as the Chevrolet Spark, the car uses a special up-stroked version of the "S-TEC II" engine (RPO code LL0).

The 2013 Spark was the fastest-selling car in the United States for July 2012, with just 6 days from when they arrived at dealers to when they were sold.

For 2014, the automatic transmission is a Jatco M4M-CVT7 continuously variable transmission (CVT) and the final drive ratio lowered to 3.75. The CVT gives better fuel mileage overall than the previous 4 speed automatic, and changing the final drive ratio from its previous 4.145 reduces engine noise and increases fuel economy on the highway while increasing noise and reducing fuel mileage in the city. Industry sources have commented on the ongoing reliability issues with the Jatco CVT transmissions.

===== Domino's DXP =====
The Domino's DXP (short for "Delivery eXPert") is a version 2015 Spark marketed in the U.S., which was customized by Roush Performance for Domino's Pizza where it was converted to a revival of a canopy express vehicle which was popular from the 1930s to the 1950s. Based on the mid-level 1LT trim of the Spark, the front and rear passenger seats are removed and replaced with storage compartments that can carry 80 pizzas, two 2-liter bottles of soda, and dipping sauces. The left rear passenger door is converted into a warming oven that can only be unlocked with the key fob or a button within the driver's door frame. The Spark's Chevrolet front grille is replaced with a custom-made black front grille with the "Domino's" logo, as well as a custom lower body kit, and all DXP cars have a custom Domino's-themed vinyl wrap with a lighted Domino's roof topper.

Production is limited to less than 200 units and once each car reaches 100,000 miles, it will be retired and returned to Roush, where it will be restored to stock form and sold as a used Spark (all four factory seatbelts and airbags are left fully intact, and covered by plastic panels). Despite the intentions of Domino's to eventually retire the DXP and leave none remaining, several wrecked DXPs have been salvaged by private individuals with the intention of retaining them as rare cars when the rest of the fleet is retired. The situation has resulted in threatened legal action by a Domino's franchisee.

==== Europe ====
The third-generation Spark was unveiled at the 2009 Geneva Motor Show. It became available in Europe in the first quarter of 2010. Engine choices include 1.0- and 1.2-litre I4 engines. In Italy there is an LPG version of the Spark called the Chevrolet Spark Eco Logic with BRC Gas Equipment as of the end of 2009. This bi-fuel version is available with the 1.0 and 1.2 engines (both with 16 valves) with 113 to 119 g of CO_{2} emissions respectively. While the LPG cars are still available in Italy, in France the LPG versions were only available from 2009 until 2012.

==== India ====
Production of the third-generation, badged as the Beat, started at Halol plant near Ahmedabad in Gujarat on 15 December 2009. It was launched in India on 5 January 2010, during Auto Expo in New Delhi. The Beat was marketed alongside the second-generation Spark, which was offered as a more affordable alternative. The Beat is powered by a 1.2 L S-TEC II engine capable of operating using petrol or LPG autogas, marketed as Smartech II. The engine was destroked from 1,206 cc to 1,199 cc for the Indian market due to lower tax imposed to vehicles with engine displacement under 1,200 cc.

In July 2011, General Motors launched the diesel version of the Beat in India. The 3-cylinder, 936 cc turbo-diesel engine produces 62.5 PS (46 kW; 62 hp) and 160.26 N⋅m (118 lbf⋅ft) of torque, resulting in good acceleration and pick up. The 1.0 L, 936 cc diesel engine enables the car to reach 100 km/h (62 mph) in 16 seconds and a top speed of 142 km/h (88 mph). Chevrolet Beat Diesel offers mileage of 24 km/L (56 mpg) as per the ARAI test reports. The engine is based on the Fiat Multijet diesel technology.

GM India was reported to build an electric version of the Spark or Beat with Reva Electric Car Company. However, after the acquisition of Reva Electric Car Company by Mahindra & Mahindra, GM India dropped the plans, and planned its own electric version.

In Auto Expo 2016 in February, GM India showcased the four-door sedan version of the Beat as the Chevrolet Essentia, and a crossover-styled concept model as the Beat Activ. Both models never went on sale in India as Chevrolet ceased sales in the country in 2017, however these models were exported to Latin America until 2021.

==== Mexico ====
In Mexico, the third-generation Spark it was released in July 2010 as a 2011 model year, but did not replace the Chevrolet Matiz (formerly Pontiac G2 Matiz), which was sold until 2015. In mid 2017, the third-generation Spark received a facelift and it was renamed the Chevrolet Beat.

On 5 August 2021, the Beat was discontinued in Mexico due to the Talegaon, India, plant being closed, leaving the Aveo as their entry-level model in said market.

==== Philippines ====
In the Philippines, the third-generation Spark is equipped with 1.0 L and 1.2 L engines. It has 2 trims; the LS (5-speed manual or 4-speed automatic) and LT (5-speed manual). It was discontinued in 2015.

==== South Korea ====
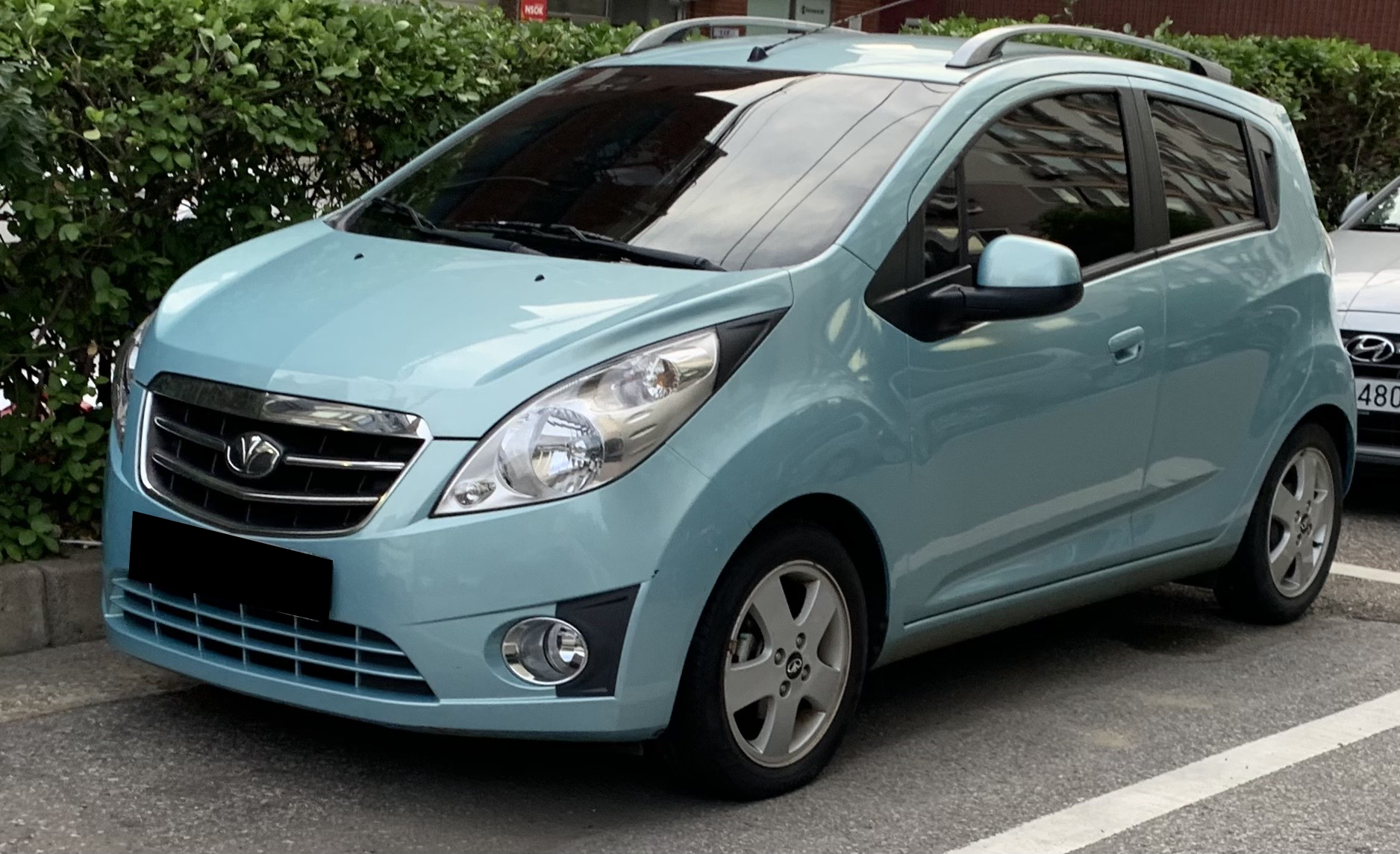
Daewoo Matiz Creative (South Korea)

The car was unveiled in South Korea as the Daewoo Matiz Creative at the 2009 Seoul Motor Show. The Matiz version was renamed to Matiz Creative. The car has a 1.0 L S-TEC II engine with 4-speed automatic transmission. Sales began on 1 September 2009. The Groove name used in one of the rejected concepts returned as a trim level.

In 2011, the Matiz Creative is renamed as Chevrolet Spark, as part of phasing out the Daewoo brand in South Korea, making way for the Chevrolet brand.

==== Australasia ====
In Australia and New Zealand, the third-generation Spark was released in October 2010 at the 2010 Australian International Motor Show in Sydney as the MJ series Holden Barina Spark. It was available in two trim levels, CD and CDX. It was discontinued in February 2018 to be replaced by the fourth-generation model.

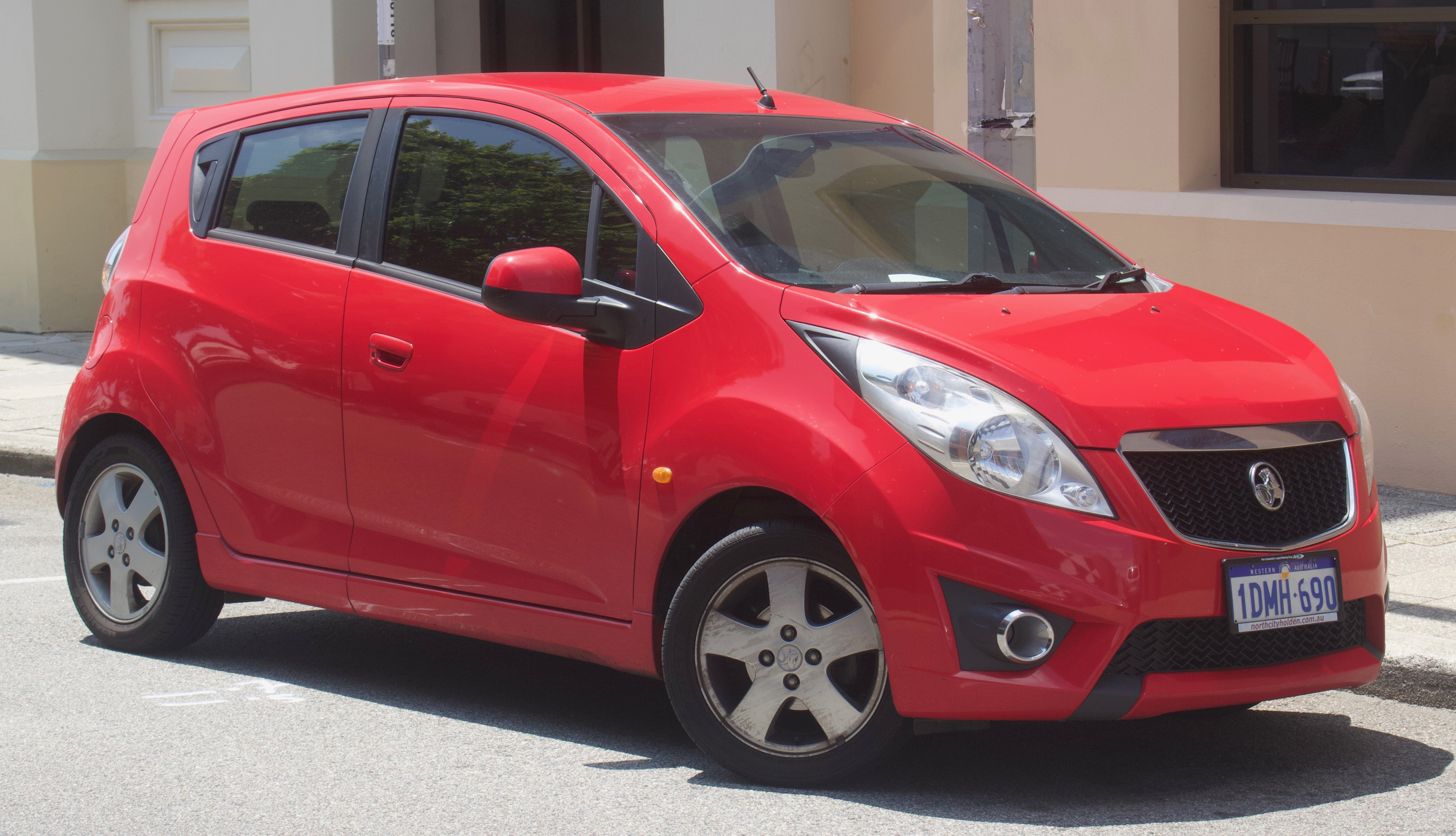
Holden Barina Spark CDX (Australia; pre-facelift)

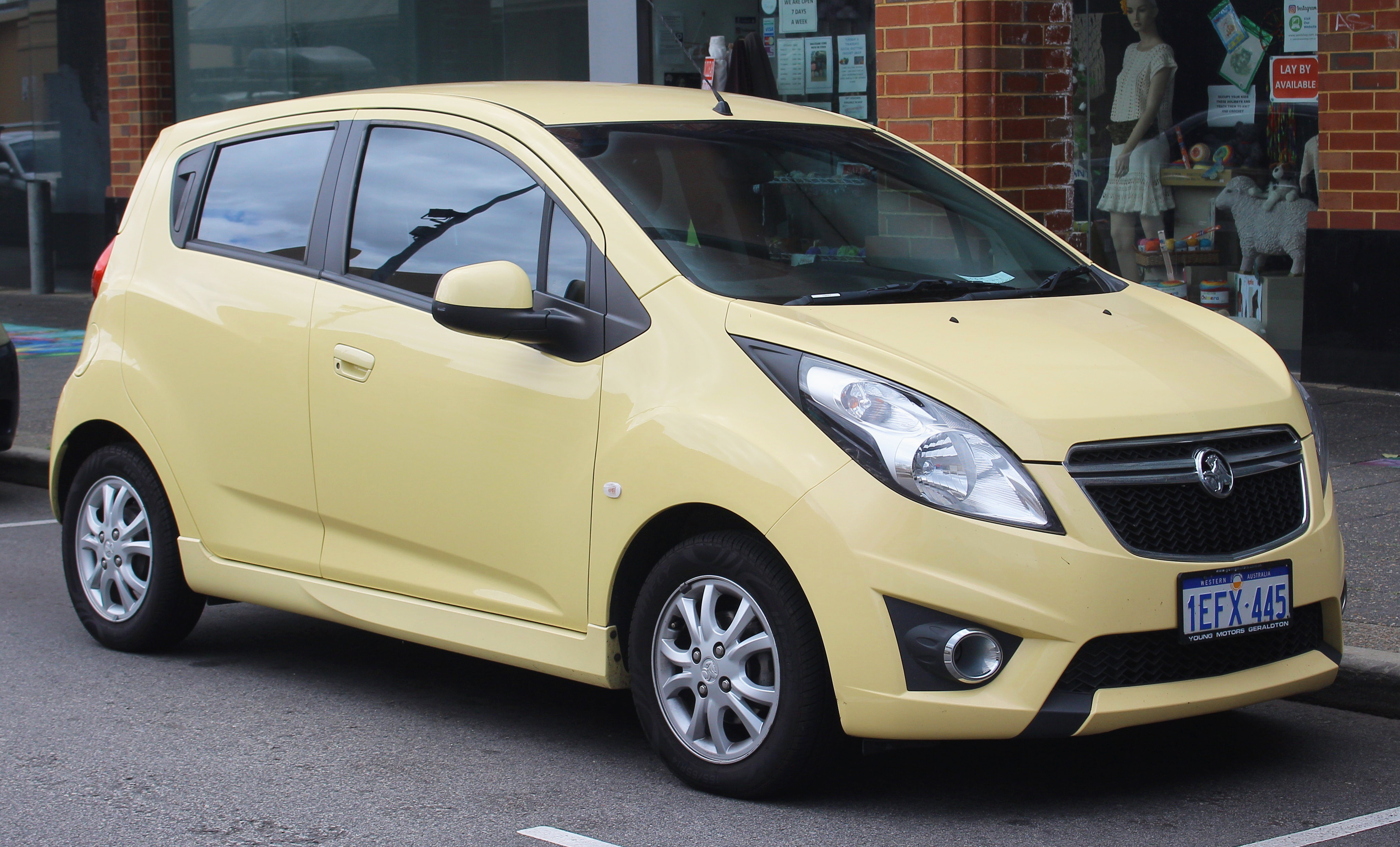
Holden Barina Spark CD (Australia; facelift)

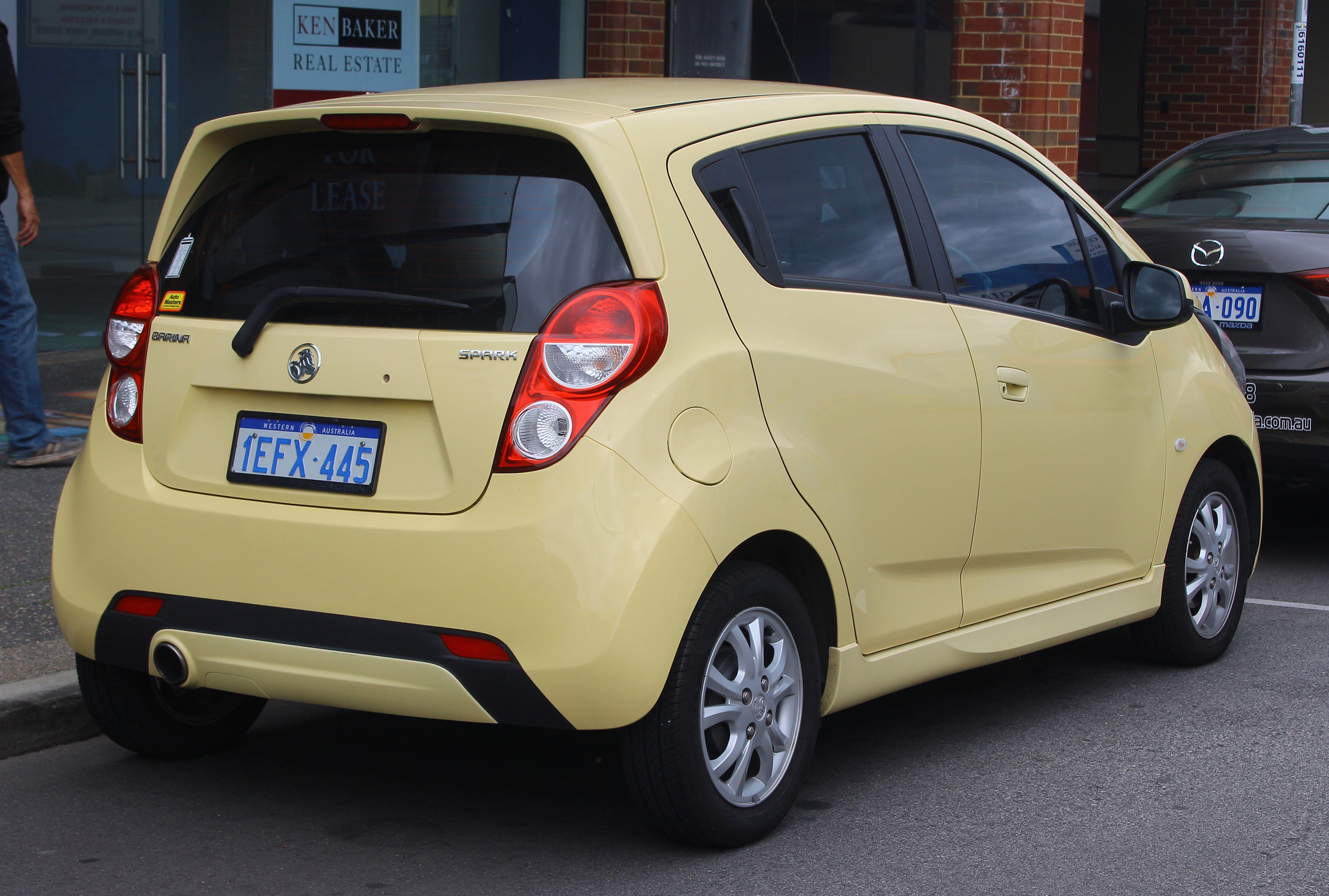
Holden Barina Spark CD (Australia; facelift)

==== Uzbekistan ====
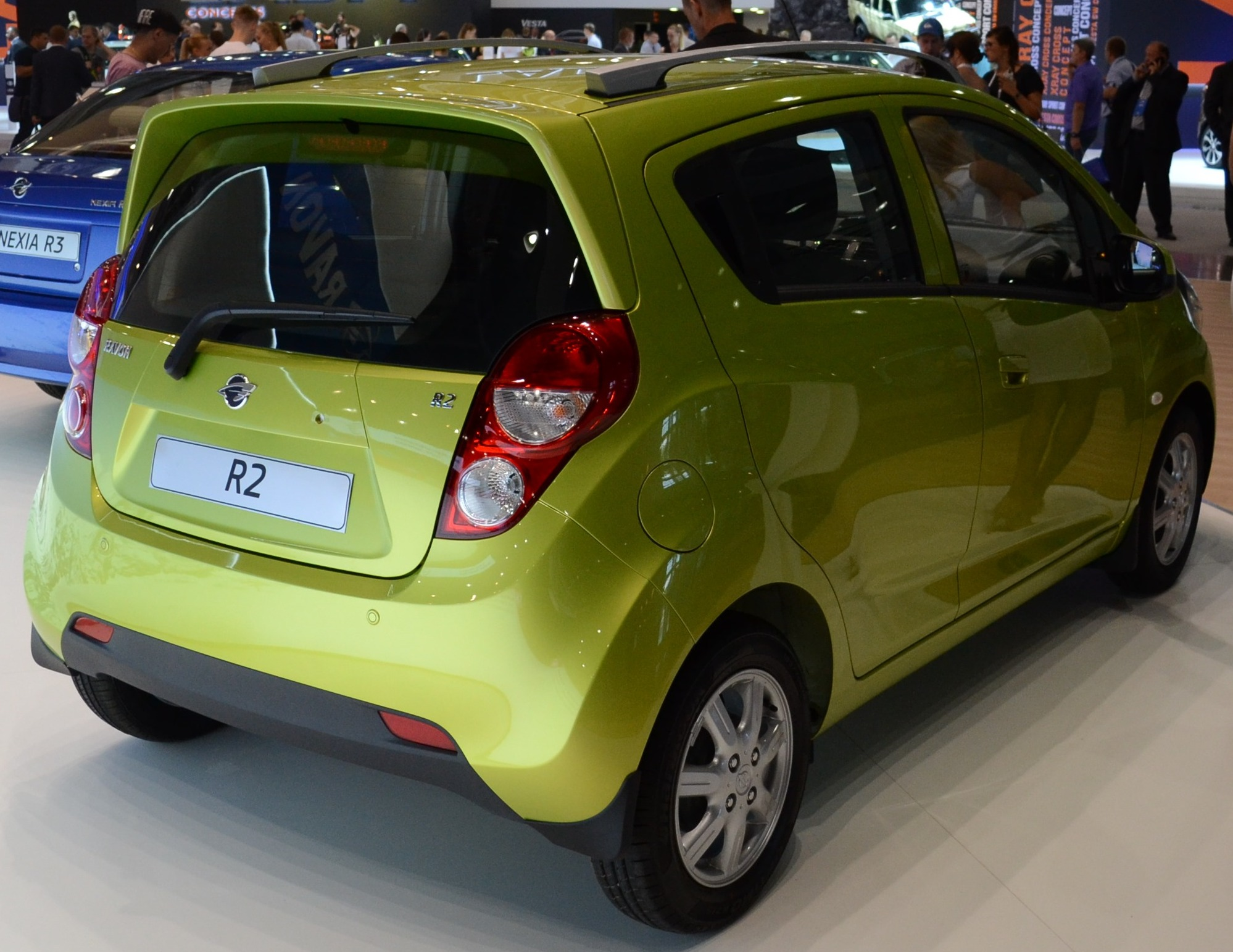
Ravon R2

The Chevrolet Spark was released in Uzbekistan in August 2010. It was available in three trim levels: L (1.0 L manual), LS (1.0 L manual/auto) and LT (1.2 L manual).

==== Russia ====
The Uzbekistan-made Spark has been sold in Russia as the Ravon R2 since 2016. It was available with the 1.2 L engine and automatic gearbox.

=== Safety ===
==== Latin NCAP ====
The Korean-made Spark in its most basic Latin American market configuration with no airbags and no ABS received 0 stars for adult occupants and 2 stars for toddlers from Latin NCAP 1.0 in 2014.

Latin NCAP 1.5 test results Chevrolet Spark - NO Airbags (2014, similar to Euro NCAP 2002)
Test	Points	Stars
Adult occupant:	00.00/17.0	0 /5 stars
Child occupant:	16.29/49.00	1 /5 stars

The Indian-made Spark GT in its most basic Latin American market configuration with no airbags, no ABS and no ESC received 0 stars for adult occupants and 0 stars for toddlers from Latin NCAP 2.0 in 2016.

Latin NCAP 2.0 test results Chevrolet Spark GT / Beat - NO (2016, based on Euro NCAP 2008)
Test	Points	Stars
Adult occupant:	0.00/34.0	0 /5 stars
Child occupant:	8.78/49.00	0 /5 stars

==== Euro NCAP ====
Euro NCAP test results* Chevrolet Spark (2009)
Test	Points	%
Overall:	4 /5 stars	
Adult occupant:	29	81%
Child occupant:	38	78%
Pedestrian:	16	43%
Safety assist:	3	43%

==== ANCAP ====
ANCAP test results* Holden Barina Spark variants (2010)
Test	Score
Overall	4 /5 stars
Frontal offset	11.02/16
Side impact	16/16
Pole	2/2
Seat belt reminders	2/3
Whiplash protection	Pending
Pedestrian protection	Pending
Electronic stability control	Standard

=== Powertrain ===
Model	Engine	Displacement	Power	Torque	0 to 100 km/h	Top speed	CO_{2} emissions	Notes
Petrol engines
1.0	S-TEC II I4	995 cc	68 PS (50 kW; 67 hp) at 6,400 rpm	93 N⋅m (69 lb⋅ft) at 4,800 rpm	15.5 sec.	96 mph (154 km/h)	119 g/km	
1.2	S-TEC II I4	1,206 cc	81 PS (60 kW; 80 hp) at 6,400 rpm	111 N⋅m (82 lb⋅ft) at 4,800 rpm	12.1 sec.	102 mph (164 km/h)	119 g/km	
1.2	S-TEC II I4	1,199 cc	80.5 PS (59.2 kW; 79.4 hp) at 6,200 rpm	108 N⋅m (80 lb⋅ft) at 4,400 rpm			115 g/km	India only
1.2	S-TEC II I4	1,249 cc	84 hp (62.5 kW) at 6400 rpm	112 N⋅m (83 lb⋅ft) at 4,400 rpm	11.3 sec.		130 g/km	North America
LPG engines
1.2	S-TEC II I4	1,199 cc	80.04 PS (58.87 kW; 78.95 hp) at 6,400 rpm	104 N⋅m (77 lb⋅ft) at 4,400 rpm			72 g/km	India only
Diesel engines
1.0	XSDE I3	936 cc	62.5 PS (46.0 kW; 61.6 hp)	150 N⋅m (111 lb⋅ft) at 1,750 rpm	16.0 sec.	145 km/h (90 mph)	108 g/km	India only; introduced in 2011

=== Spark EV ===
Chevrolet Spark EV

Overview
- Manufacturer: General Motors
- Production: June 2013 – December 2016
- Model years: 2014–2016

Body and chassis
- Body style: 5-door hatchback
- Layout: Front-motor, front-wheel drive
- Platform: Gamma II

Powertrain
- Electric motor: MY 2015–16: 105 kW (141 bhp) AC permanent magnet; MY 2014: 97 kW (130 bhp) AC permanent magnet
- Transmission: MY 2015–16: Single-speed transaxle, 3.87:1 ratio; MY 2014: Single-speed transaxle, 3.17:1 ratio
- Battery: MY 2015–16: 19 kWh Li-ion by LG Chem; MY 2014: 21.3 kWh LiFePO by A123 Systems
- Electric range: 132 km (82 mi) (EPA)
- Plug-in charging: SAE J1772: 3.3 kW 100–240 V onboard charger for 1Φ 12 A AC; CCS Combo 1: 50 kW DC (optional)

Dimensions
- Wheelbase: 2,370 mm (93.5 in)
- Length: 3,720 mm (146.5 in)
- Width: 1,600 mm (64 in)
- Curb weight: 1,356 kg (2,989 lb)

Chronology
- Predecessor: General Motors EV1
- Successor: Chevrolet Bolt

Rear view

The Chevrolet Spark EV is a limited production 5-door hatchback battery electric vehicle produced by Chevrolet from 2013 until 2016. The Spark EV was a compliance car specifically designed to meet the government mandate on automobile manufacturers to increase the penetration of electric automobiles into the fleet of all operating vehicles on the road in certain US states, but was not intended for broad adoption in the broader US market, nor produced and sold in quantities that would meet demand for such vehicles in the open market where no such government rules exist.

In October 2011, General Motors announced the planned production of the Chevrolet Spark EV, with availability limited to select markets starting in 2013. The production version was unveiled at the November 2012 Los Angeles Auto Show. Within the framework of GM's vehicle electrification strategy, the Spark EV was the first all-electric passenger car marketed by General Motors in the U.S. since the EV1, which had been discontinued in 1999.

Sales

The Spark EV was released in the U.S. in June 2013, with availability initially limited to the markets in California and Oregon. The first vehicle was leased to a family in the Studio City neighborhood of Los Angeles. The electric car went on sale in Maryland in the second quarter of 2015, the first East Coast state where the Spark EV was available.

US annual sales
Year	Sales
2013	539
2014	1,145
2015	2,629
2016	3,035
2017	23
Total	7,371

As of December 2014, U.S. sales totaled 1,684 units. In April 2015, GM announced a price cut of US$1,650, to US$25,995 (equivalent to $35,310 in 2025) and simultaneously announced a new lease deal of US$139 (equivalent to $190 in 2025) per month, along with additional discounts ranging from US$1,000 to 3,500, depending on the state. Sales jumped by approximately nine times, from an average of 100 per month to 920 in April 2015 alone, in response to the price cut. The Spark EV was discontinued in December 2016, when Chevrolet began selling the Bolt, which had a much longer range and wider availability. In total, it was estimated from incentive data that 7,371 Spark EVs were sold or leased to customers in the United States, including a few leftover vehicles in 2017.

Retail sales of the Spark EV began in South Korea in October 2013. The Spark was also available in Canada for limited fleet sales starting in 2014.

Technical

The electric car was initially powered by a 21.3 kWh lithium iron phosphate (LiFePO) battery pack supplied by A123 Systems. In a white-paper, the nanophosphate material used in the cathode was touted as increasing battery life and safety. In 2014, for the 2015 model year, the battery pack supplier was changed to LG Chem and the chemistry was changed to lithium-ion (Li-ion) which resulted in a smaller capacity pack (19 kWh) while maintaining the same EV range, which was estimated at 82 mi (132 km) with a combined (city and highway) economy rating of 119 miles per gallon gasoline equivalent (0.176 kW⋅h/km; 0.28 kW⋅h/mi) under the EPA cycle for all model years. The weight of the traction battery was reduced by 86 lb (39 kg) with the move to the smaller pack. It is carried over the rear axle and is equipped with a liquid thermal management system.

The Spark EV is equipped with a standard onboard charger that can accept AC power at a maximum rate of 3.3 kW. When equipped with an optional CCS/SAE Combo Type 1 DC power inlet, the Spark EV can be fast-charged to 80% of capacity in 20 minutes. Using the onboard AC charger, charging time increases to about seven hours using a dedicated 240-volt charging station or about 20 hours using a standard household 120-volt outlet. It is the first car in the United States to offer a CCS Combo inlet.

The 2014 production version featured a 97 kW (130 hp) motor, providing 542 N⋅m (400 lb⋅ft) of torque. The electric motor and final drive unit were assembled in GM's Baltimore Operations plant in White Marsh, then shipped to South Korea where they were fitted to the vehicles. Alongside the new battery for the 2015 model year, torque output was reduced to 443 N⋅m (327 ft⋅lb) while power rose to 105 kW (141 hp) and the drive ratio was also changed from 3.17 to 3.87.

== Fourth generation (M400; 2015) ==
Fourth generation
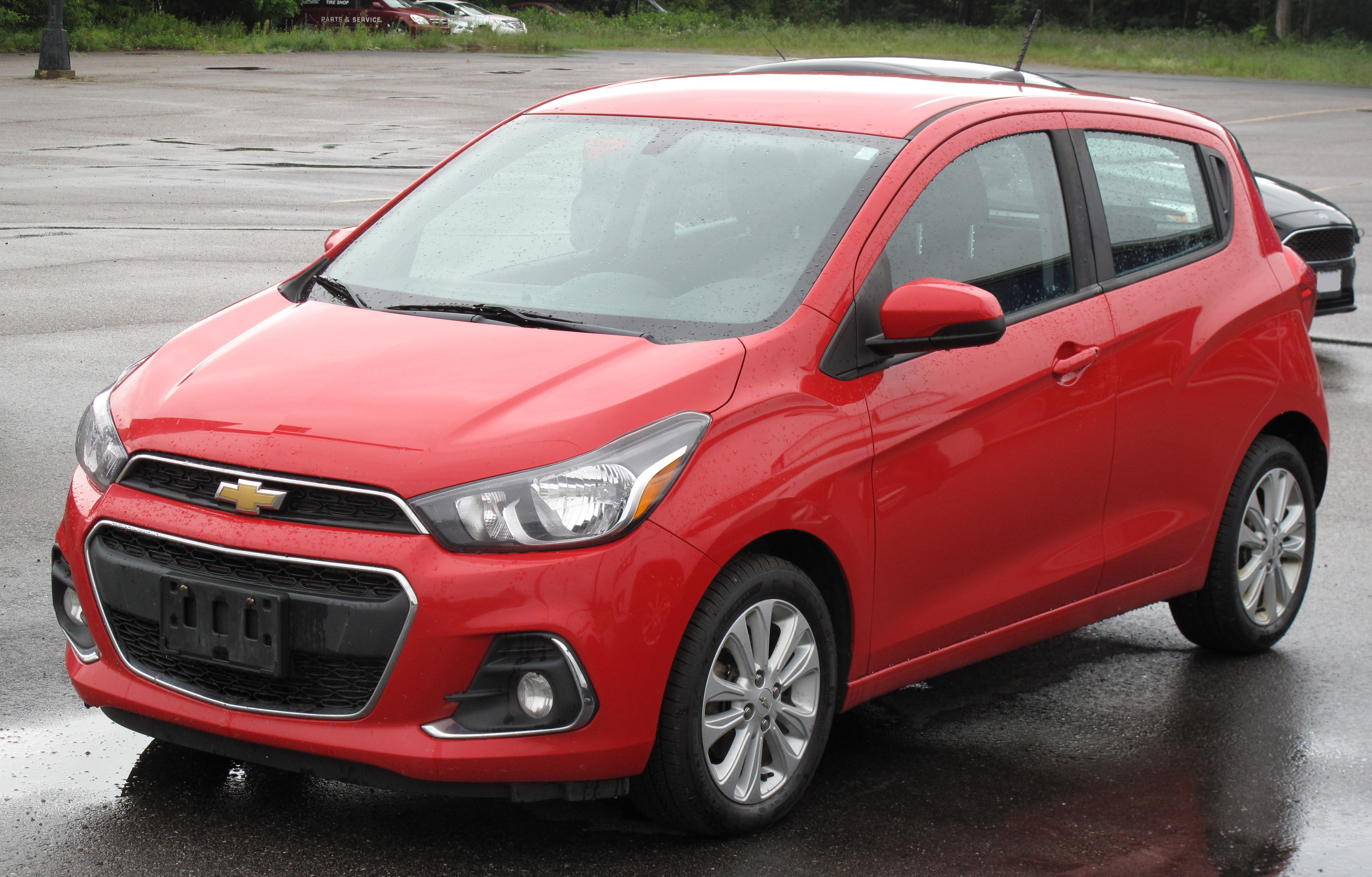
- Chevrolet Spark LT (North America; pre-facelift)

Overview
- Model code: M400
- Also called: Holden Spark (Australasia)
- Production: 2015–2022
- Model years: 2016–2022 (North America)
- Assembly: South Korea: Changwon (GM Korea)

Body and chassis
- Body style: 5-door hatchback
- Related: Opel Karl / Vauxhall Viva; VinFast Fadil

Powertrain
- Engine: Petrol: 1.0 L L5Q I3; 1.4 L LV7 I4
- Transmission: 5-speed manual; CVT

Dimensions
- Wheelbase: 2,385 mm (93.9 in)
- Length: 3,636 mm (143.1 in); 3,595 mm (141.5 in) (South Korea)
- Width: 1,595 mm (62.8 in)
- Height: 1,483 mm (58.4 in)
- Curb weight: 1,019–1,049 kg (2,247–2,313 lb)

The fourth-generation Spark, internally designated M400, was styled under the direction of GM Global Design Chief Michael Simcoe, debuted at the April 2015 New York International Auto Show and went on sale in the fourth quarter of 2015. Mildly restyled and equipped variants were marketed as the Holden Spark in Australia and New Zealand, Opel Karl in Europe (excluding the United Kingdom), Vauxhall Viva in the UK, and VinFast Fadil in Vietnam (produced under license). Variations included revised instrument panel, side swaging and a small quarter light in the rear door, displacing the high-mounted rear door handles of the Spark.

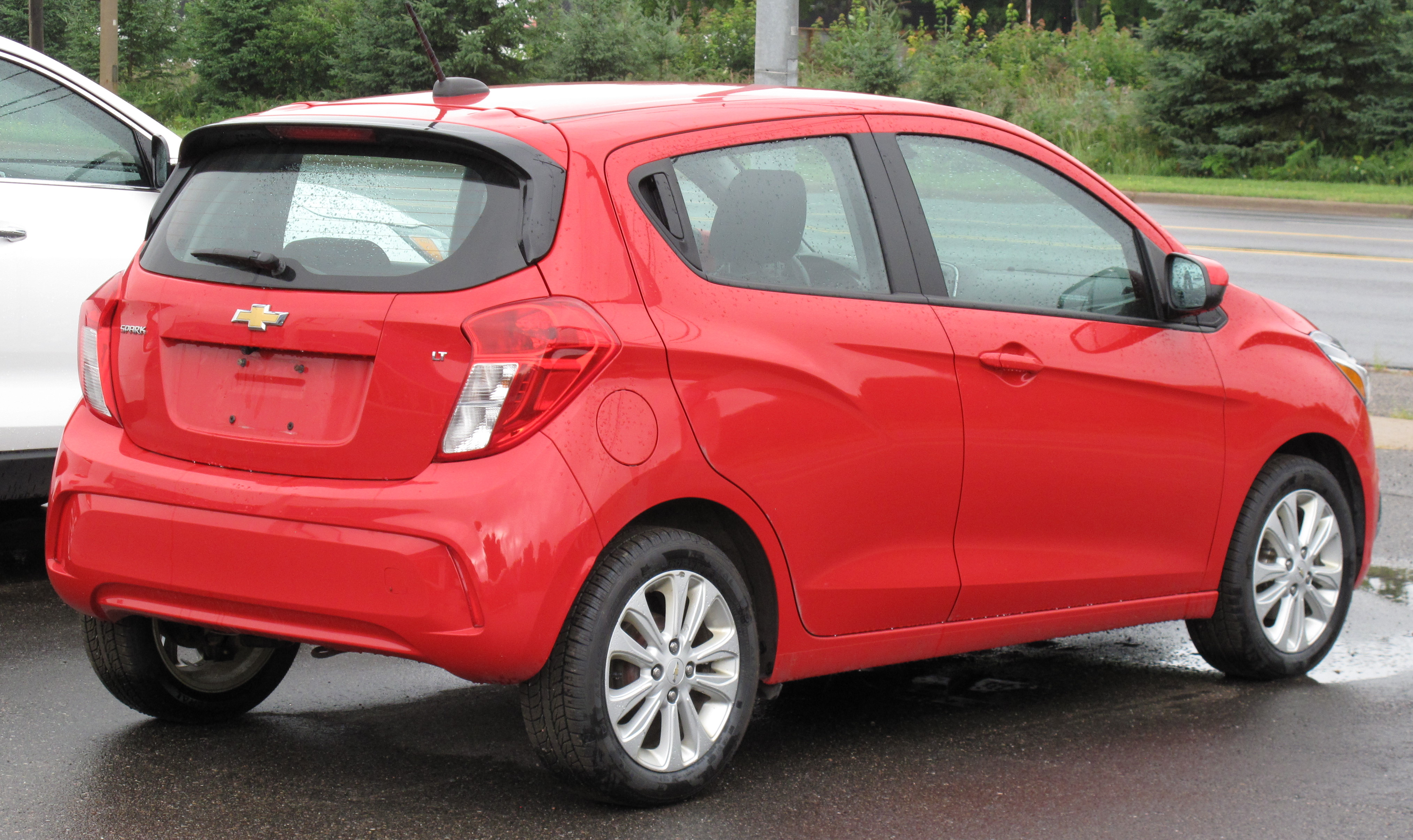
Rear view

=== Powertrain ===
In North America, at introduction, the fourth-generation Spark is powered by a 1.4-litre, 1,399 cc (85 cu in) LV7 DOHC I4 gasoline engine producing 98 hp (73 kW) and 94 pound-feet (127 N⋅m) torque. The Korean domestic version as well as Opel, Vauxhall and Holden variants used a 1.0 L engine producing 75 hp and 70 pound-feet torque.

Engines
Engine	Displacement	Power	Torque	(0-60)mph	Top speed	Notes
1.0 L	999 cc	75 hp	70 lb-ft	12.4 s	108 mph	Korea and EU Only
1.4 L	1399 cc	98 hp	94 lb-ft	11 s		

=== Markets ===
==== United States ====
In the United States, the Spark was available in four trim levels: base LS, mid-level 1LT, lifestyle-oriented ACTIV (available starting with the 2017 model year), and top-tier 2LT. Each trim level was available with either a standard five-speed manual transmission, or a continuously variable transmission (CVT).

==== Canada ====
Canada received the LS, 1LT, and 2LT models. The biggest seller by far was the 1LT; 85 percent of Canadian buyers opted for an 1LT fitted with the automatic transmission.

==== Mexico ====
The Spark was launched for the Mexican market on 4 November 2015, as a 2016 model and only offered in the LT and LTZ trim lines, both of them powered by a 1.4-liter engine.

=== 2018 facelift ===
In 2018, for the 2019 model year, the Spark received a mid-cycle facelift. Changes included a new third-generation seven-inch Chevrolet Infotainment 3 infotainment system, revised exterior styling, optional low-speed autonomous emergency braking (AEB) on selected models, and new exterior color options. In the United States, the facelifted Spark went on sale in the third quarter of 2018 for model year 2019. For Mexico, the model was facelifted in October 2018 as a 2019 model, discontinuing the LTZ trim line and adding the Premier and Activ trim lines.

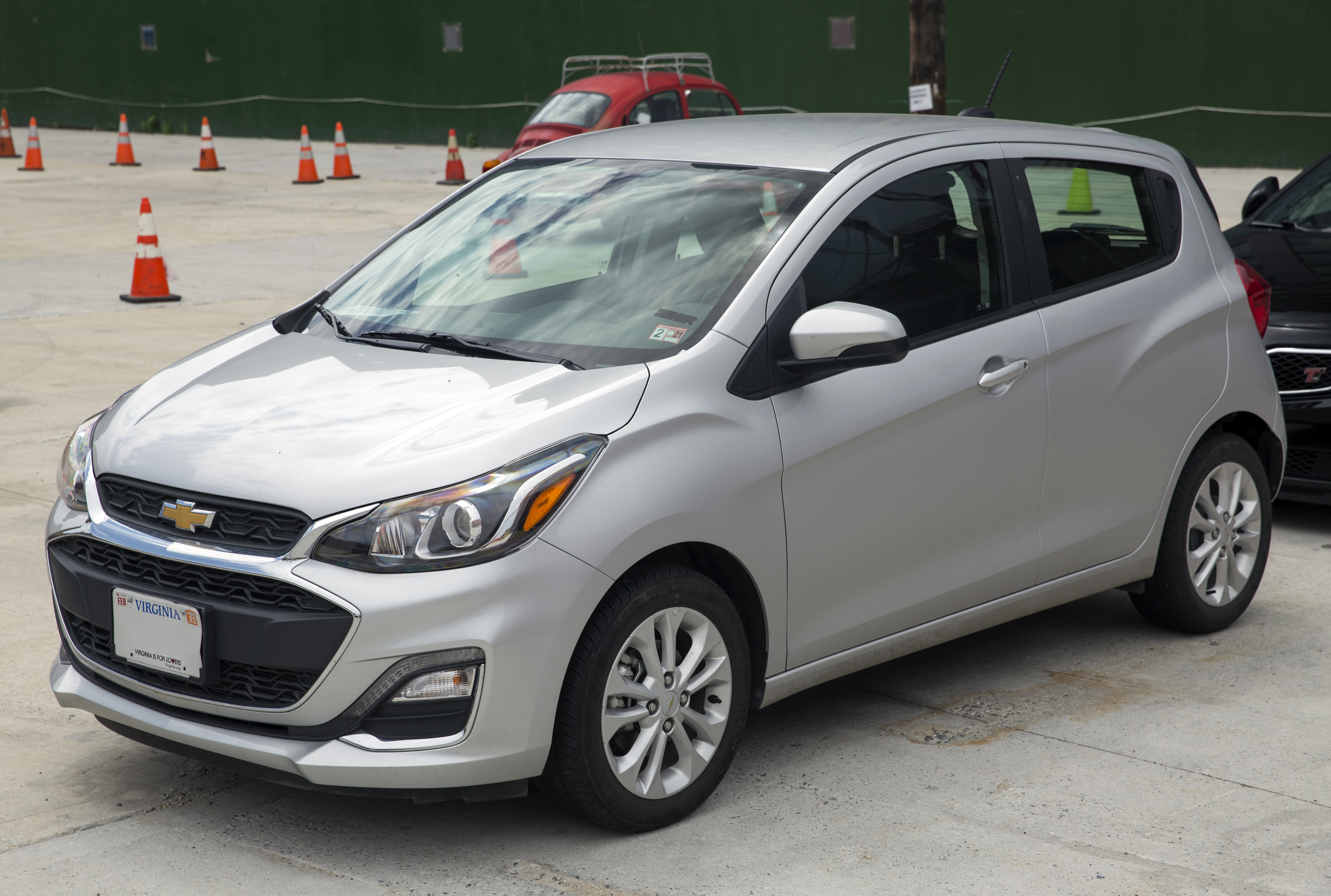
Facelift

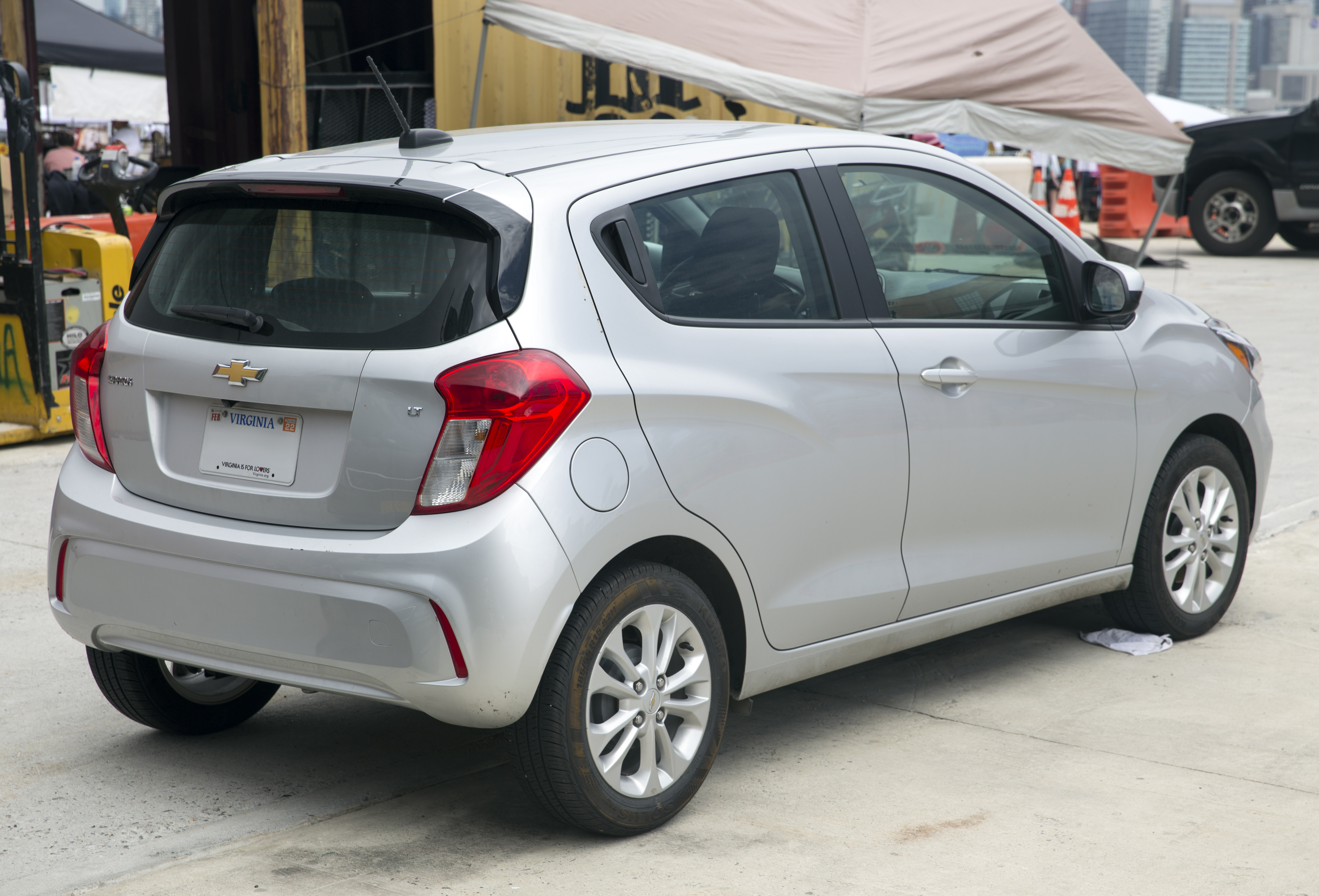
Facelift

=== Spark Activ ===
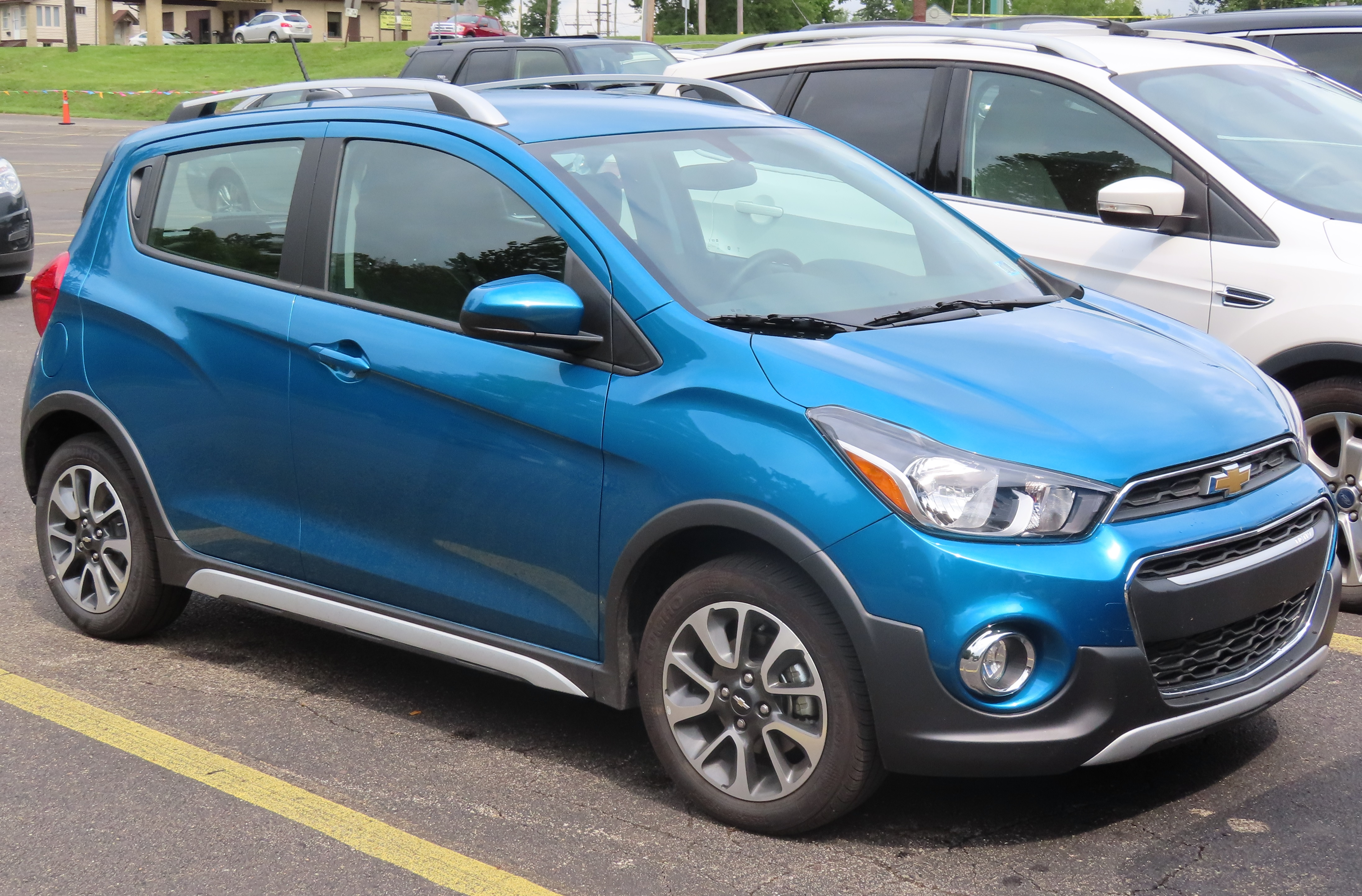
Chevrolet Spark ACTIV

For the 2018 model year, GM introduced the Activ trim level between the 1LT and 2LT trims, including leatherette-trimmed seating surfaces, heated front seats, leather-wrapped steering wheel, aluminum-alloy wheels, unique black exterior styling elements, roof rails, rear liftgate badging, and ground clearance increased by 0.4 inches. It was not offered for sale in Canada.

=== Safety ===
ANCAP test results* Holden Spark all variants (2016)
Test	Score
Overall	5 /5 stars
Frontal offset	12.79/16
Side impact	15.81/16
Pole	2/2
Seat belt reminders	3/3
Whiplash protection	Good
Pedestrian protection	Adequate
Electronic stability control	Standard

== Discontinuation ==
Chevrolet discontinued the Spark after the 2022 model year. Production ceased in August 2022. At the time of discontinuation, the Spark was the United States and Canada's least expensive new car on sale. Production in South Korea ceased on 8 September 2022.

== Global marketing and manufacture ==
=== Asia ===
In India, it was launched in 1999 as the Daewoo Matiz. In 2007, General Motors India launched the Chevrolet M3X concept based third generation, as the Chevrolet Spark. In Japan, the Matiz was sold under the GM Daewoo brand through the Yanase Co., Ltd. dealership network, but was considered a "compact car" due to the length, width and engine displacement exceeding the Kei car regulations. In the Philippines, the Matiz was available during the years 1999–2000 through the grey market. In 2007, it was released under the name Chevrolet Spark. In Pakistan, the car was initially introduced as Chevrolet Exclusive in 2003. From 2005 to 2009 it was manufactured by Nexus Automotive (importers and assemblers of General Motors Korea and Daewoo vehicles in Pakistan) under the name Chevrolet Joy, which has now been replaced by the newer M200 series and is currently sold as the Chevrolet Spark. In Taiwan, the Matiz was sold under the Formosa brand between 2001 and 2009.

=== Europe ===
From 1998 until 2004, the Matiz was sold in Europe under the Daewoo badge. In 2004, it took the Chevrolet marque, as well as the other South Korean models of General Motors, such as the Lacetti and Kalos. Since 2000, CKD kits have been supplied to UzDaewooAuto, FSO and Rodae, to be built and sold in Uzbekistan, Poland and Romania respectively. At the beginning of 2005, FSO began marketing the Matiz under their own brand. The Chevrolet Matiz were briefly marketed as the Chevrolet Spark in the UK. The fourth generation was marketed in most of Europe as the Opel Karl and as the Vauxhall Viva in the UK until both were discontinued in 2019.

=== Americas ===
In Mexico, the Matiz was introduced to the market in 2003. The 2006 model was renamed to Pontiac Matiz G2. It was also sold as Pontiac Matiz and Pontiac G2. The Pontiac G2 was discontinued in Mexico after a short run of 2010 models as the brand was closed by General Motors. The new version was officially launched as the Chevrolet Spark in August 2010, and the Matiz continues to be sold alongside the Spark. An M300-based vehicle is currently in production in Brazil as a replacement for the Chevrolet Celta. In Colombia, the Matiz was imported by Daewoo distributors between 2002 and 2005 and then GM Colmotores began to assemble and sell it branded as Chevrolet Spark. In 2006, a taxi version called 7/24 was launched. In Costa Rica, Dominican Republic, El Salvador, Honduras, Panama, Uruguay and Venezuela, it is sold as the Chevrolet Spark. In Argentina, the first generation was sold as the Daewoo Matiz through Daewoo importers. The second generation was sold as Chevrolet Spark through Chevrolet dealers. Since 2011, the third generation is available. In Chile, Ecuador, and Peru, the former version is sold as the Chevrolet Spark, and the latest version as the Chevrolet Spark GT. In Paraguay, it was initially sold as Daewoo Matiz, but from 2008, it is sold through Chevrolet dealers.

In North America, the Spark was initially marketed in three trim levels, 1LS, 1LT, and 2LT, as well as the EV.

In Canada, the Spark has been marketed as the country's least expensive new car from the 2016 model year, with a starting price of $9,988. For that price, the base Spark does not include air conditioning, and comes with a manual transmission. It competed with the similarly priced Nissan Micra (until that car's discontinuation in Canada as of the 2019 model year).

=== Africa ===
In South Africa, General Motors South Africa (GMSA) announced on 2 October 2010, plans to manufacture the new Chevrolet Spark at its Port Elizabeth plant. The second generation Spark is still sold, though branded as a 'Spark Lite'.

=== Middle East ===
In Iran, the Matiz was produced (first imported and later assembled) and known as Daewoo Matiz. In Israel, UMI (Universal Motors Israel) announced on 18 January 2011, the marketing commencement of the 1.2L Chevrolet Spark model.

=== Australasia ===
Within Australia and New Zealand, the Spark was sold through the Holden brand. Sales commenced in February 2016, with two specifications launched. The LS was the base specification, which features steel wheels, central locking as well as Holden's MyLink infotainment system. Building upon the LS, the LT adds 15-inch alloy wheels, keyless entry and a rear view camera.

With light car sales decreasing in Australia, Holden announced in April 2018 that they would discontinue the Spark in Australia. Although, it continued to be sold in New Zealand until the demise of the Holden brand in 2020.

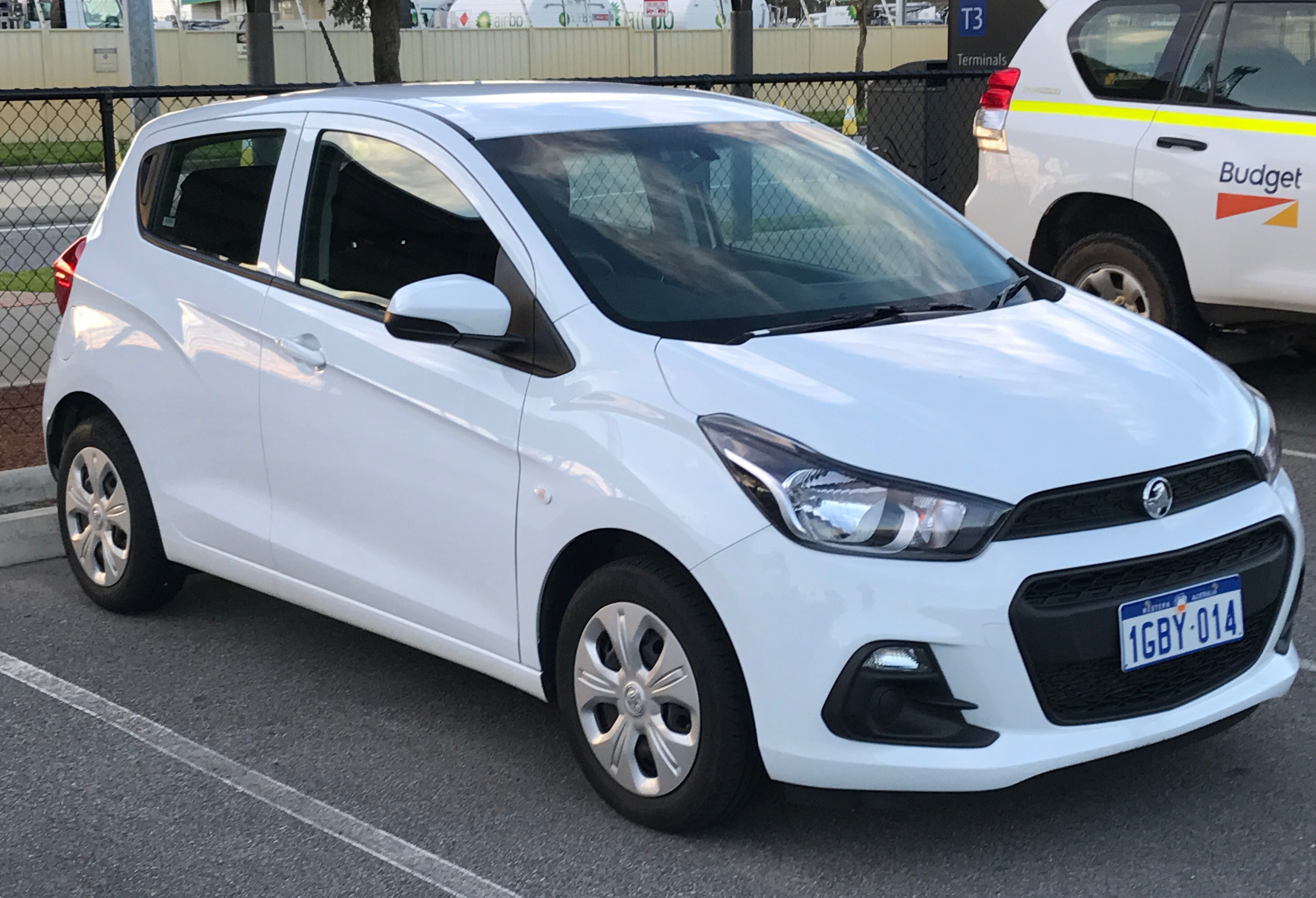
Holden Spark (Australia)

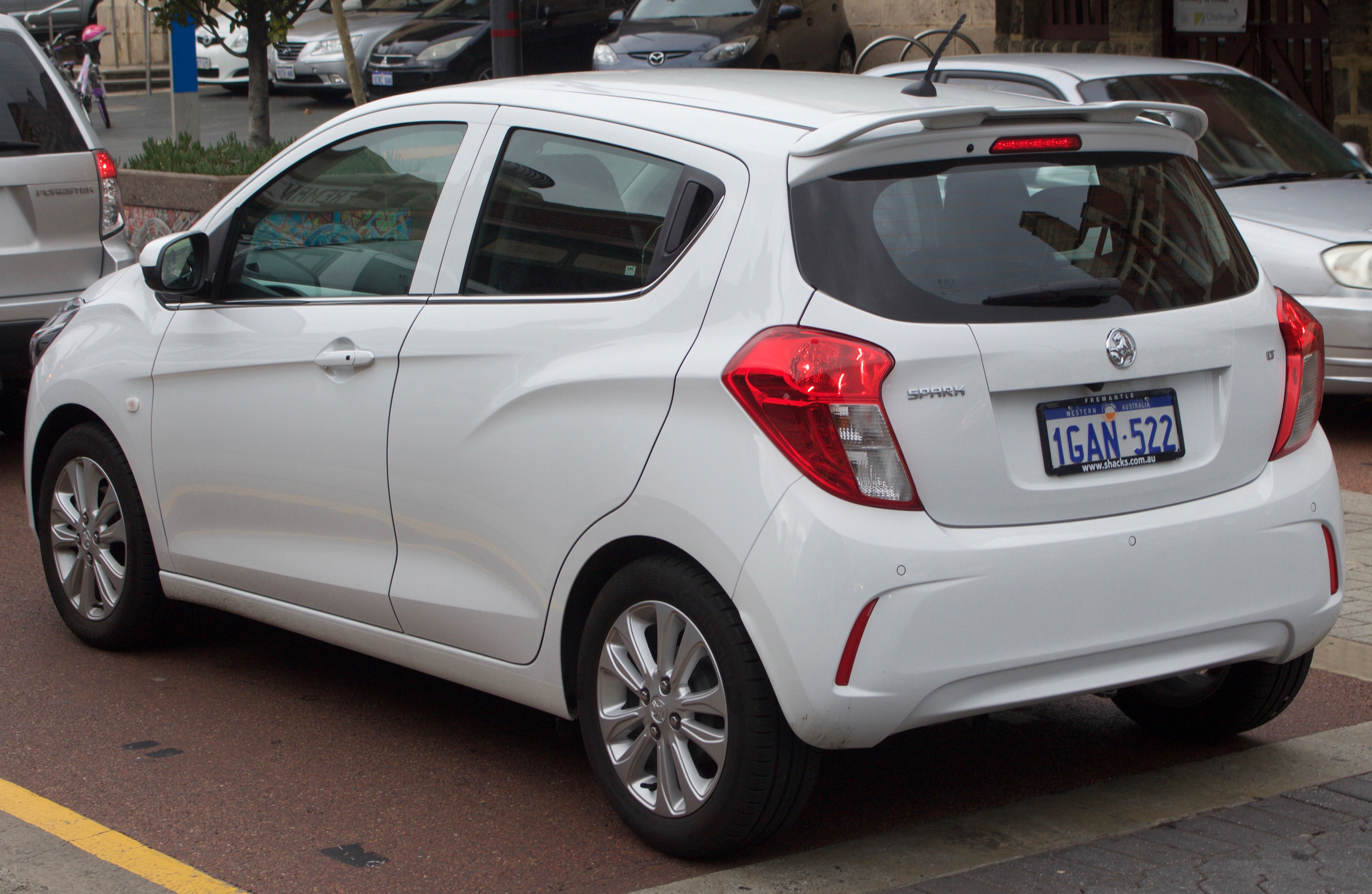
Holden Spark (Australia)

== Sales ==
Year	United States	South Korea	Europe	Mexico			
Year	United States	South Korea	Matiz/Spark	Spark	Spark EV	Beat	Matiz
1999			90,524				
2000			104,481				
2001			69,106				
2002			58,640				
2003			50,539				
2004			79,409				
2005			73,189				
2006			61,456				
2007			67,352				
2008			65,562				
2009			78,748				
2010			73,769				
2011			65,205				
2012	12,385		46,562	23,107			16,048
2013	34,130		37,268	29,505			16,481
2014	39,159		10,138	36,479			21,362
2015	32,853		479	42,827	2		23,786
2016	35,511		96	74,075	3		
2017	22,589	47,244	2	46,990		40,220	
2018	23,602	39,868	3	9,690		70,656	
2019	31,281	35,513	-	10,243		69,114	
2020	33,478	28,935	-	5,463		41,782	
2021	24,459	17,975	-	3,562		19,265	
2022	13,710	10,963	-	107			

== See also ==
- Opel Karl
