= Oltcit =

Romanian automobile manufacturer (1976–1991)

Oltcit S.A.
- Oltcit logo (1986–1991)
- Type: Joint venture
- Industry: Automotive industry
- Founded: November 14, 1976
- Defunct: March 1, 1991
- Fate: Change of ownership
- Successor: Oltena
- Headquarters: Craiova, Romania
- Products: Automobiles
- Owner: Romanian state (64%); Citroën (36%)

Oltcit S.A. (Romanian: [oltˈsit]) was an automobile manufacturer, established as a joint venture between the communist Romanian government (64%) and Citroën (36%). Their main products were the Oltcit Club and Citroën Axel hatchbacks, assembled in Craiova, Romania.

== History ==
Oltcit emerged as a result of a partnership between the Romanian state authorities (government) and the French car manufacturer Citroën. Thus, a year later, in 1977, in Craiova, the construction of a modern factory for the construction of a small car began.

In 1979, at the EREN exhibition in Bucharest, the "National Economy Achievements Exhibition", the new Oltcit car brand was officially launched, which had two variants: a 652 cc and 36 HP engine and a 1130 cc and 56 HP engine. The new Oltcit cars were to be mass-produced from 1980.

Four versions were produced at the factory:

- Oltcit Special - equipped with a 652 cc engine from the Citroen Visa and LNA.
- Oltcit Club - equipped with a 1129 cc engine and 4-speed gearbox.
- Oltcit Club 12 TRS - originally fitted with a 1200cc engine but replaced with a 1299cc engine and 5-speed gearbox; it was a car destined for export to France, the Netherlands, Belgium, Hungary, Czechoslovakia, Poland, Yugoslavia, Argentina, Uruguay, Paraguay, Ecuador, Venezuela, Costa Rica, Colombia, Syria, Jordan, Egypt, Turkey and Bulgaria.
- Oltena Club 12 CS - available since 1993, a two-seater small pick-up truck; 1299cc engine and a 5-speed gearbox with power-friendly ratios.

Production continues under the name of Oltcit until 1991, when the name was changed to Oltena (the logo was also changed) because Citroën decided to withdraw from the joint venture. The production of those versions continued until the signing of the contract with Daewoo, when another name change took place, from Oltena to Rodae.

In 1991, as a result of the withdrawal of Citroën from the joint venture, the name of the company was changed to S.C. Automobile Craiova S.A. and production continued under the Oltena brand.

In 1994, a joint venture (49%-51%) was established between the Korean company Daewoo Heavy Industries and S.C. Automobile Craiova S.A., called Rodae, later renamed Daewoo Automobile Romania.

In 2008, Ford of Europe, a division of Ford Motor Company, took over the former Oltcit/Daewoo factory, which became known as Ford Romania.

== Models ==
- Special/Club
- Citroën Axel

== Gallery ==
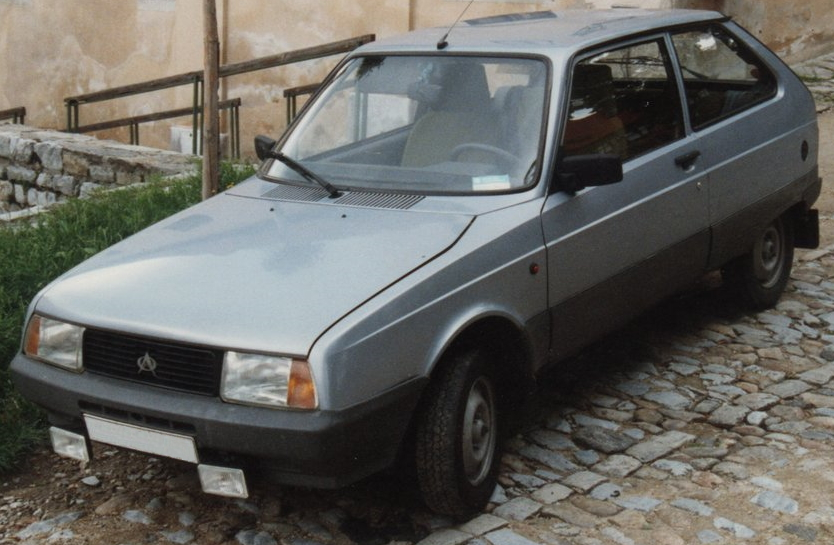
Oltcit Club

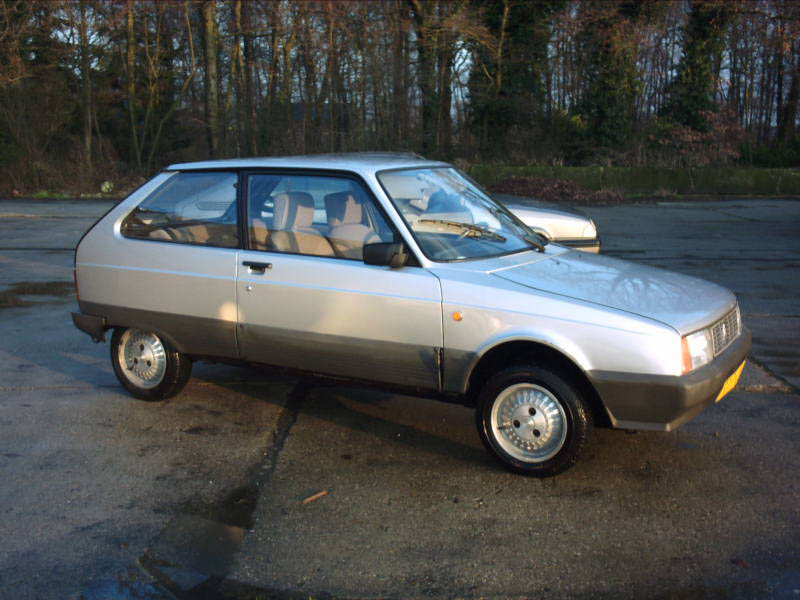
Citroën Axel

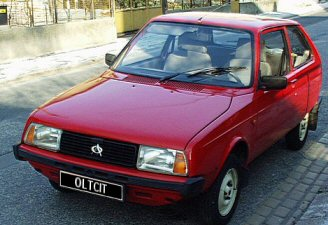
1984 Oltcit Special

== See also ==
- Bulgarrenault
- Oyak-Renault
- Polski Fiat
