= Ford Romania =

Automobile manufacturing company

Ford Otosan Romania SRL
- Type: Subsidiary
- Industry: Automotive
- Predecessor: Automobile Craiova
- Founded: 21 March 2008; 18 years ago
- Headquarters: Craiova, Romania
- Key people: Fırat Elhüseyni (president)
- Products: Automobiles, engines
- Production output: ▼248,328 vehicles (2025)
- Revenue: ▲21.041 billion lei (€4.02 million) (2025)
- Net income: ▲399 million lei (2025)
- Number of employees: ▲6,481 (2025)
- Parent: Ford Otosan
- Website: ford.ro

Ford Otosan Romania SRL, commonly referred to as Ford Romania, is an automobile manufacturing company operated by Ford Otosan, located in Craiova, Romania. The company was established in 2008 after Ford's purchase of Daewoo Automobile Romania. In 2022, the Ford Romania company was purchased by Ford Otosan and changed its name to Ford Otosan Romania SRL.

The first Ford subsidiary company in Romania was founded in Bucharest in 1931 and functioned until 1948 when it was nationalized by the Communist authorities. In the 1930s the factory owned by Ford Româna could manufacture 600–700 vehicles per year and was one of six Ford facilities with both assembly and production lines.

== History ==
=== 20th century ===
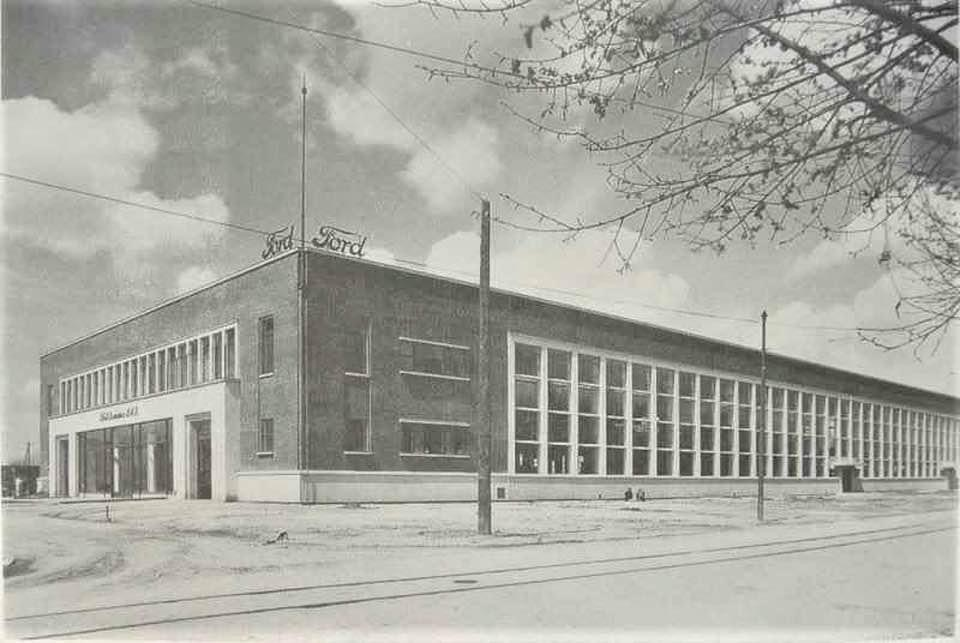
Ford Factory in Floreasca, Bucharest, 1935

Royal Garage imported Ford cars as early as May 1911. Shortly, other agencies such as Colin & Co., Leonida & Co., Noel S.A.R, and Raf S.A.R. expanded the market. Numerous political figures owned Ford cars. Among them was Ion I. C. Brătianu, whose daughter used to call her car Forduța. Ford cars were an instant success, thus between May 1911 and November 1912, Royal Garage already sold 106 Ford cars. On December 8, 1920, Collin & Co. requested on behalf of the Ford Motor Company the permission to build an assembly plant in Romania. Unfortunately, Vintilă Brătianu, who was "notoriously anti-American", rejected the proposal to the regret of the people directly involved as well as the public opinion.

In October 1927, William G. Collins (in the future, assistant manager in Alexandria, Egypt) renewed the proposal for establishing an assembly plant in Constanța. Finally, in 1931, Ford Motor Company opened a subsidiary in Bucharest – Ford Româna S.A.R. This was followed by the establishment of an assembly line in Bucharest in 1932, after the conclusion of the negotiations between King Carol II and Henry Ford. On March 1, 1935, Ford Romania addressed a request for building a new plant on Calea Floreasca, under the name Uzina de Montaj Ford Româna S.A.R. The architect was Paul Emil Miclescu, with the contribution of Ioana Golescu. The company had previously bought 7,535 square meters from Imobiliara Chrissoveloni, at the price of 2,335,850 lei on September 26, 1934. Furthermore, Ford Romania intended to receive the advantages granted by the law encouraging the national industry, to sign a treaty for ten years, and to import 2,500 units per year, and the ability to increase this number if the demand would be higher. Lastly, the company requested to be taxed on parts rather than on built-up units.

On May 6, 1936, the Government reduced the privileges granted to Ford, thus the number of imported units dropped to 100; the names of the parts were individually identified, such as paint, valve oil. On May 15, 1936, the assembly plant situated in Bd. V. Craiu (Calea Floreasca) opened. The capacity of this assembly plant was 2,500 cars per year and different reparations at 6,000 cars yearly. The employees comprised: "250 workers, from whom five foreign foremen, five technicians and a Romanian draughtsman. The technical manager was a Romanian engineer (L. D. Greceanu). The administrative management was to be held by a general manager, Austrian citizen, helped by five managers, four Romanian citizens and a Swiss one, who are helped at the office by twelve bookkeepers and twenty-six administrative clerks, five of them foreign citizens".

Ford Româna S.A.R. started the first car production line in Eastern Europe at the facility in the Floreasca neighborhood of Bucharest where it assembled 1935 Ford (V8-48 and V8-68 models), 1937 Ford (V8-74/78, V8-81A/82A, V8-91A/92A and V8-01A/02A models), in Standard and De Luxe versions, Mercury Eight, as well as Marmon-Herrington and Fordson trucks. In the 1930s, the facility from Bucharest was one of six such facilities that Ford owned in the world. The production output of the plant reached 600–700 vehicles per year with other vehicles being assembled from imported kits. In 1937, Edsel Ford was named administrator of the Bucharest factories, while Nicolae Malaxa was assigned as the president of the Ford Romania company. By 1939, the Bucharest factory diversified its products with various types of trucks built on the Fordson 157 truck chassis which was entirely produced in the country.

The plant continued production until World War II when the factory was placed under the control of the Romanian Army and continued mainly repair activities for the army vehicle fleet. Production of military trucks also continued with 2,320 3-ton trucks, 200 fuel trucks and 488 Marmon-Herringtons delivered between 1939 and 1942. With Romania taking Germany's side during the war, the imports from the United Kingdom and the United States were stopped and a new Austrian director was placed in charge of the factory. After August 1944, the plant continued repair works for both Romanian and Soviet army vehicles. After the war, in 1948, the company was nationalized, and changed its activity to become Automatica in 1960, a manufacturer of electrical equipment and automation.

=== 21st century ===
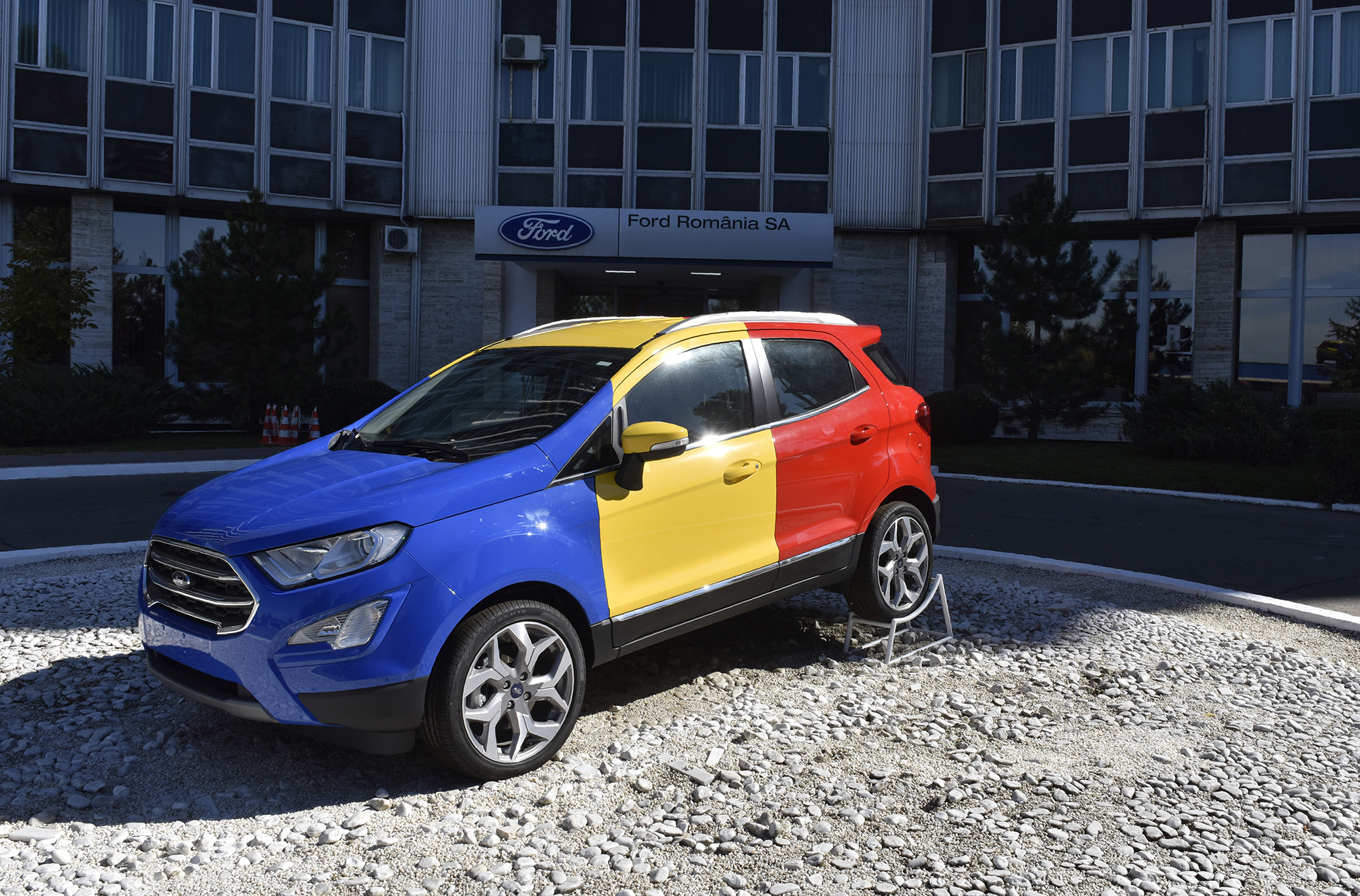
Ford EcoSport in front of the Ford Romania headquarters

In modern times the company is located in Craiova, in the former Oltcit car factory, reorganized as Oltena and later became the Daewoo Motors facility in Romania (as Daewoo Automobile Romania), which Ford acquired in 2008 from the Romanian government.

Vehicle production at the plant began in September 2009 with the Ford Transit Connect, and later with the Ford B-Max. Engine production at the plant includes three- and four-cylinder versions of Ford's EcoBoost engine family. The plant has a production capacity of 300,000 units per year and it was the country's third company by value of exports in 2016.

In March 2016, it was announced that the Ford EcoSport will be built at the Craiova plant starting from the autumn of 2017, moving production for the European market from the manufacturing plant in Chennai, India. This happened on the background of the growing market for the SUV segment in Europe, and brought an investment of €200 million to the factory. In 2019, Ford began production of the Ford Puma at the facility in Romania.

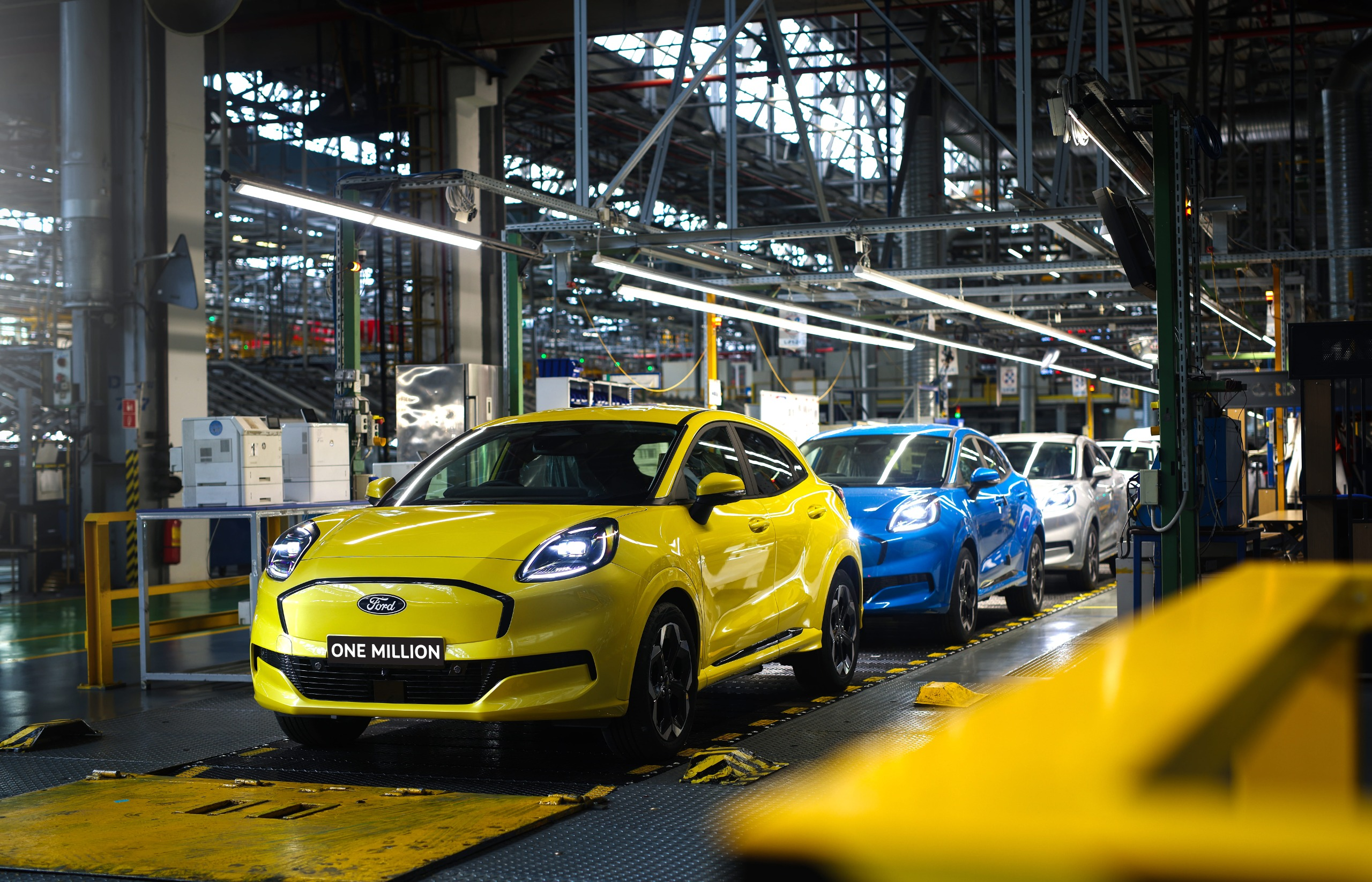
The one-millionth Ford Puma Gen-E on the assembly line

In March 2022, it was announced that Ford Otosan is going to purchase the ownership of Ford Romania. The transfer of the Craiova facility from the Ford Motor Company subsidiary Ford of Europe was completed in July 2022. The same year, Ford Otosan announced that the production will be increased and electric car models will also be produced. In 2024, the company received a loan of 435 million euros from a consortium of banks intended to expand the investments into equipment, installations and engineering area of the Craiova factory.

=== Leadership ===
- Dionisio Campos (2008–2010)
- Jan Gijsen (2010–2016)
- John Oldham (2016–2018)
- Ian Pearson (2018–2021)
- Josephine Payne (2021–2023)
- Müjdat Tiryaki (2023–2024)
- Fırat Elhüseyni (2024–present)

== Products ==
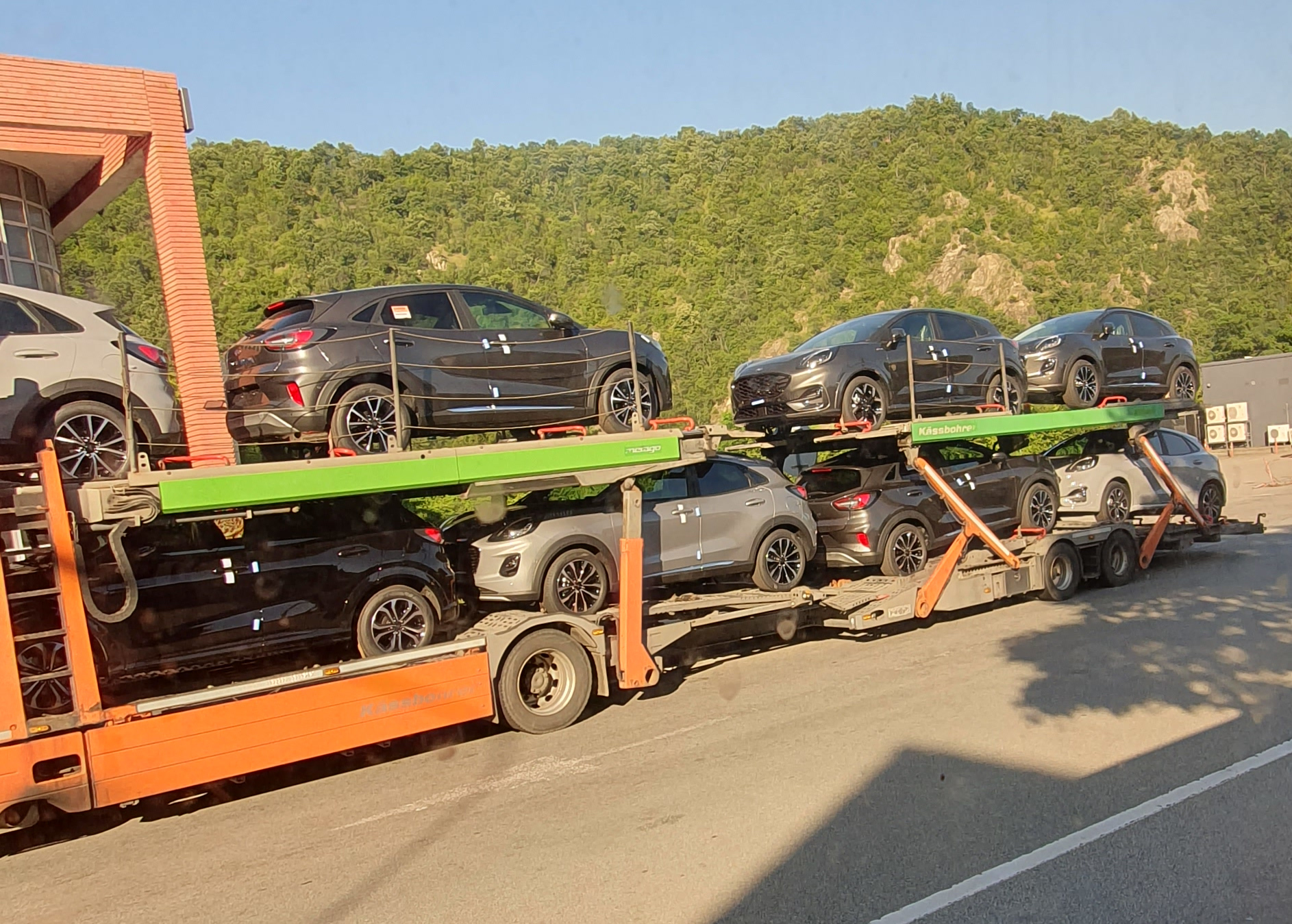
Ford Pumas loaded on a car carrier trailer in Romania

=== Automobiles ===
- Ford Puma (2019–present)
- Ford Transit Courier II (2023–present)
- Ford Puma Gen-E (2024–present)

=== Historic ===
- Ford Transit Connect I (2009–2012)
- Ford B-Max (2012–2017)
- Ford EcoSport (2017–2023)

=== Engines ===
- 1.0 L EcoBoost I3 (2012–present)
- 1.5 L EcoBoost I4 (2013–2014)

== See also ==
- Automobile Craiova
