= Oltcit Club =

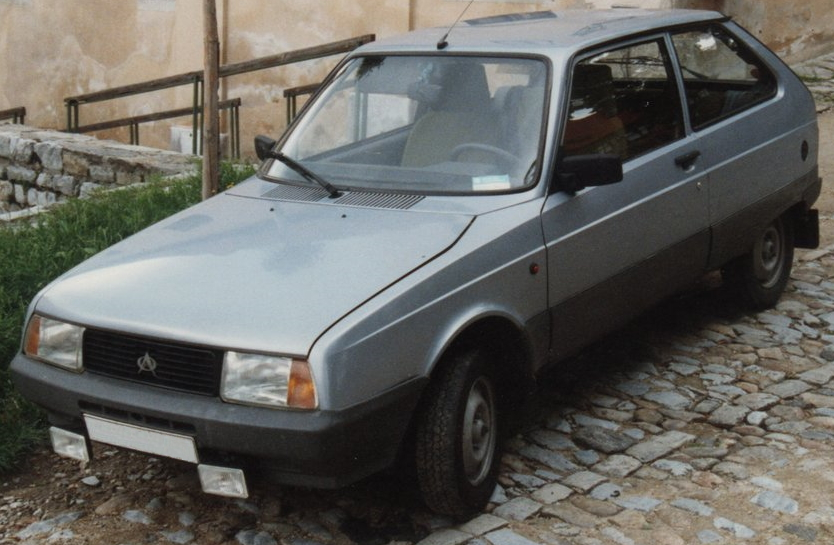

Overview
- Manufacturer: Oltcit (1981–1991); Oltena (1991–1994); Rodae (1994–1996)
- Also called: Citroën Axel (1981–1990); Oltcit Special; Oltcit Axel; Oltena Club (1991–1994); Rodae Club (1994–1996)
- Production: 1981–1996
- Assembly: Romania: Craiova

Body and chassis
- Class: Supermini (B)
- Body style: 3-door hatchback 2-door pick-up
- Layout: Front-engine, front-wheel-drive

Powertrain
- Engine: 652 cc air-cooled H2; 1129 cc air-cooled H4; 1299 cc air-cooled H4
- Transmission: 4 / 5-speed manual

Dimensions
- Wheelbase: 2,370 mm (93.3 in)
- Length: 3,732 mm (146.9 in)
- Width: 1,538 mm (60.6 in)
- Height: 1,430 mm (56.3 in)
- Curb weight: 835–875 kg (1,841–1,929 lb)

Chronology
- Predecessor: Citroën Dyane (Citroën Axel)
- Successor: Citroën AX (Citroën Axel)

The Oltcit Club is a supermini produced between 1981 and 1991 and developed in co-operation by Citroën of France and Oltcit, a joint venture company with the Romanian government.

They were powered by the air-cooled engines from the Citroën GS/GSA; the air-cooled flat-twin engine from the Citroën Visa used in the Romanian-market Oltcit Special was not installed in the export-only Citroën Axel.

== Development history ==
From 1965 Robert Opron worked on the Citroën G-mini prototype and project EN101, a projected replacement for the 2CV using that car's flat twin engine. It was supposed to be launched in 1970. The advanced space-efficient designs, with very compact exterior dimensions and an aerodynamic drag co-efficient C_{d} of 0.32, were axed because of adverse feedback from potential clients. The more conservative final design has a Cd of 0.36 (for the Axel 12 TRS, 0.37 for the Axel 11).

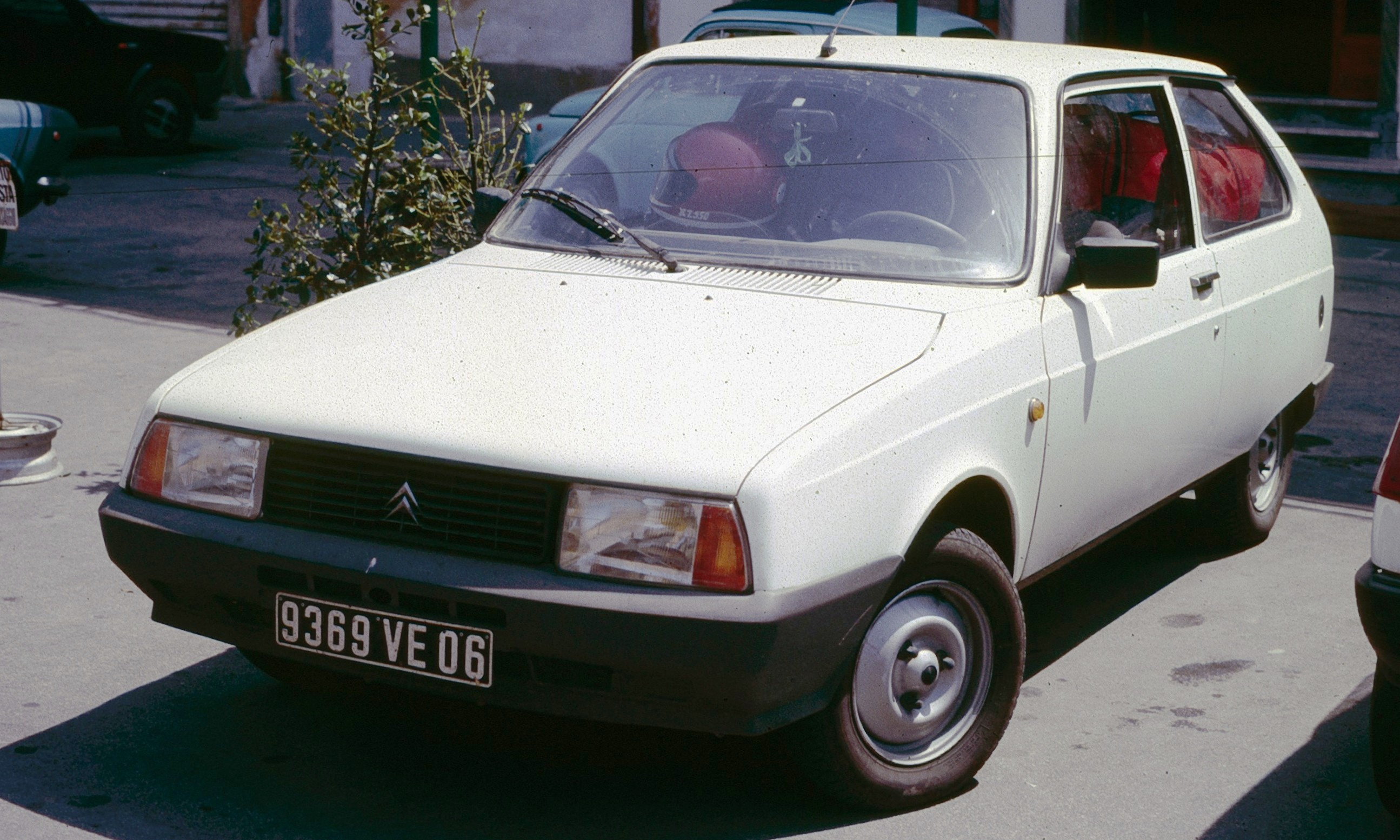
Citroën Axel 11

The early seventies Citroën Prototype Y, intended to replace the 2CV-based Citroën Ami which dated back to 1960, was developed in co-operation with Fiat. It built on the lessons from the Citroën G-mini and EN101 projects. It used the then new and advanced Fiat 127 platform, featuring a transversely mounted engine driving the front wheels, with an end-on gearbox layout that Fiat had pioneered in the 1960s. When cooperation with Fiat ended, a new Citroën-designed platform was planned. After the takeover of Citroën by Peugeot in the wake of the 1974 oil crisis, the renamed "Projet VD (Voiture Diminuée)" became the Citroën Visa, incorporating the floor pan of the Peugeot 104 and using the advanced 104 engine with the (under-engine) transmission and chassis. It was the first new model under the platform-sharing policy of PSA Peugeot Citroën that continues today. The earlier Citroën LN was no more than a facelift of the Peugeot 104Z "Shortcut" with a re-engine and transmission from the Citroën Dyane.

Eventually, in 1981, the original Citroën platform design from "Project Y" emerged as an Oltcit in Romania, using a Citroën Visa flat-twin engine and Citroën GS-based gearbox, and Citroën GS flat-four engine and gearbox. Like the GS, it also featured four wheel disc brakes, with the front ones mounted inboard to lower unsprung weight. Beginning in July 1984, it was also sold in Western Europe as the Citroën Axel. Citroën was hoping to recoup money that Citroën had invested in Romania that the communist government could not repay. The Axel had been scheduled for an earlier introduction, but Oltcit had been unable to provide either the quality or the quantity expected by their French partners. This project was problematic for Citroën due to productivity and build quality issues and 60,184 cars were made, even though the base models were priced below the 2CV in Western Europe. The Axel was never sold in the UK.

When launched in France, Citroën acknowledged that the Axel was a competitor of their Visa. However, that the Axel only had three doors and was of a simpler, more robust design was considered enough to offset any possible loss of (already shrinking) Visa sales. The four-cylinder Axel 11 was 10 percent cheaper than a two-cylinder Visa in the French market. It also had a particularly low rear loading height, which, with its sturdy, basic construction, contributed to being particularly well received by farmers and denizens of smaller towns.

In addition to the regular Axel, there was also a light commercial version with no rear seats available, called the "Axel Entreprise."

== Production ==
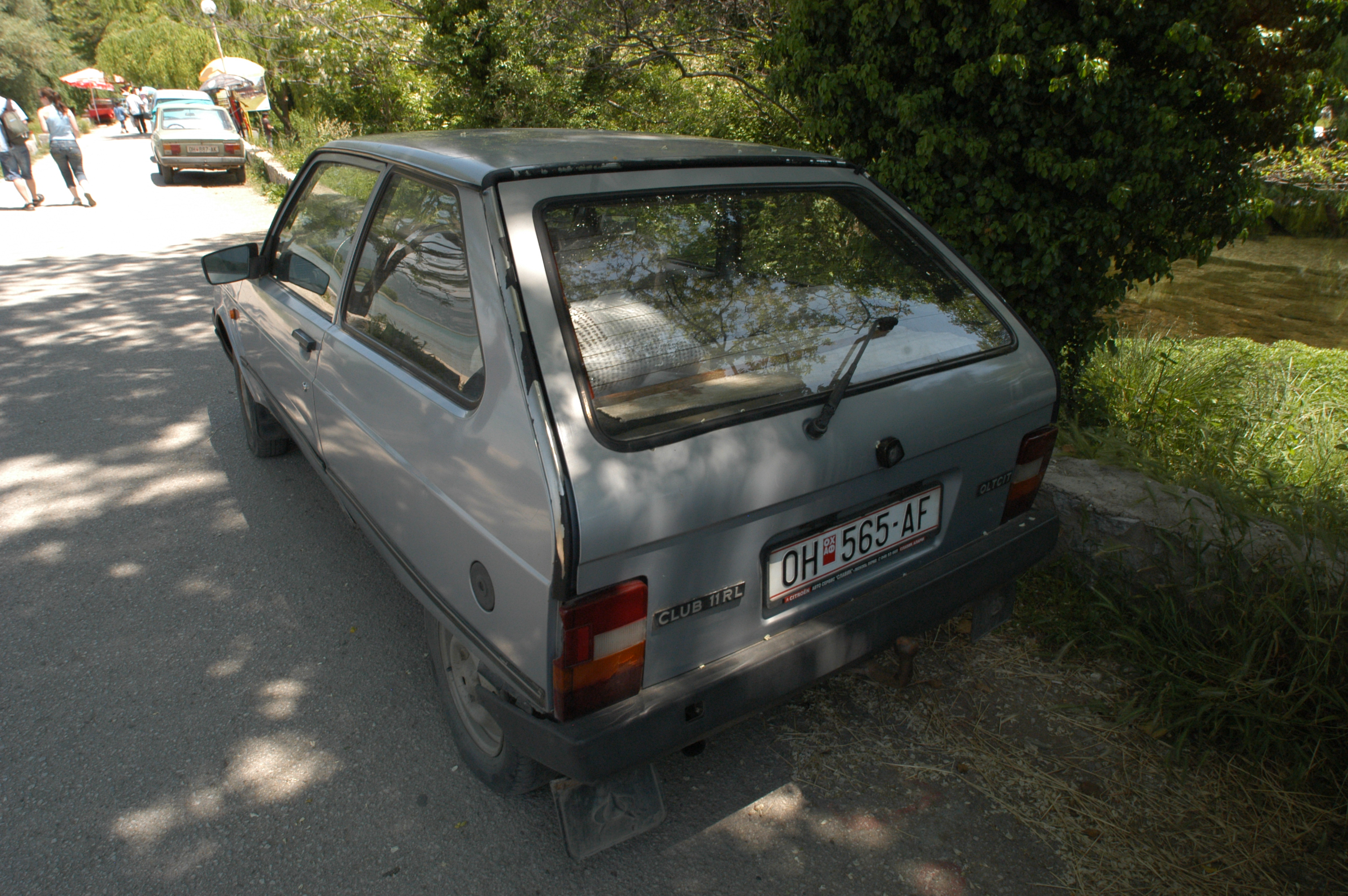
Oltcit Club rear

The Oltcit Club carried on with the Prototype Y-derived design and was sold between 1981 and 1991. It was also sold in Western Europe, often badged as the Citroën Axel.

In 1991, as a result of the withdrawal of Citroën from the joint venture, the name of the manufacturing company was changed to Automobile Craiova and production continued under the Oltena brand.

After 1994, it was sold under the Rodae brand, when the company decided to go into partnership with Korean company Daewoo Heavy Industries (later Daewoo Motors).

== Oltcit Club 12 CS ==
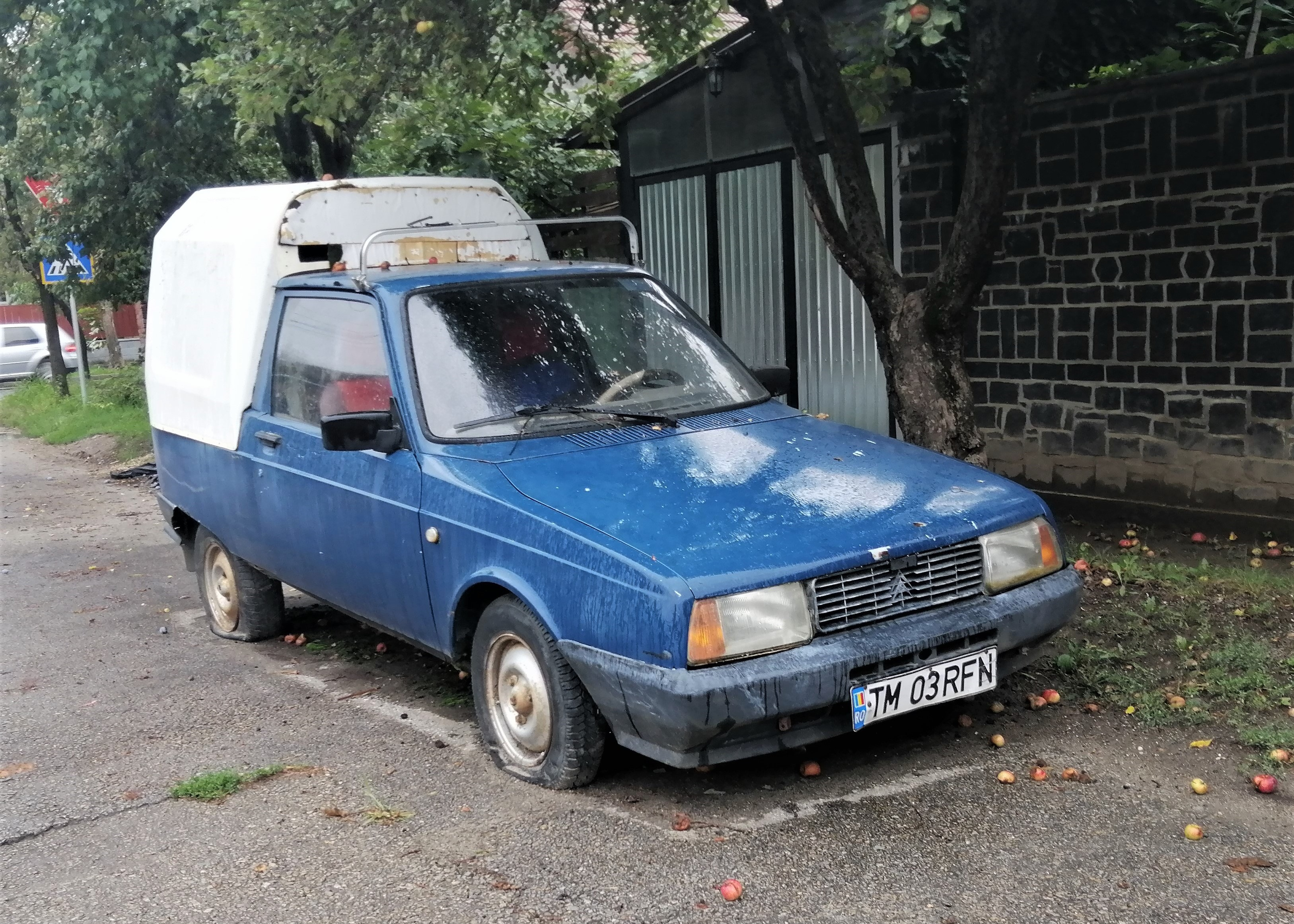
Oltcit Club 12 CS

The Oltcit Club 12 CS is a small pick-up based on the Oltcit Club. It was launched in 1993 with a 1299 cc engine and a 5-speed gearbox with ratios that favor power. This model also has thicker rear torsion bars to withstand a greater load.

== Engines ==
Name	Capacity (cc)	Type	Power	Torque	Top speed	Consumption (liters/100 km)
VO36/630	652	air cooled flat twin, OHV	34 PS (25 kW; 34 hp) at 5250 rpm	49 N⋅m (36 lb⋅ft) at 3500 rpm	121.2 km/h (75.3 mph)	6.8 litres per 100 kilometres (42 mpg_{‑imp}; 35 mpg_{‑US})
G11/631	1129	air cooled flat 4, SOHC	57.4 PS (42 kW; 57 hp) at 6250 rpm	79 N⋅m (58 lb⋅ft) at 3500 rpm	149.4 km/h (92.8 mph)	8.1 litres per 100 kilometres (35 mpg_{‑imp}; 29 mpg_{‑US})
T13/653	1299	air cooled flat 4, SOHC	61.5 PS (45 kW; 61 hp) at 5500 rpm	96 N⋅m (71 lb⋅ft) at 3250 rpm	157 km/h (98 mph)	7.3 litres per 100 kilometres (39 mpg_{‑imp}; 32 mpg_{‑US})

== Models ==
=== Oltcit-branded models ===
- Oltcit Special (652 cc)
- Oltcit Club 11 (1129 cc)
- Oltcit Club 12 TRS (1299 cc)
- Oltcit/Oltena Club 12 CS (pick-up version) (1299 cc)

=== Citroën-branded models ===
- Citroën Axel 11 R Entreprise (1129 cc)
- Citroën Axel 11 R (1129 cc)
- Citroën Axel 12 TRS (1299 cc)
- Citroën Axel 12 TRS Entreprise (1299 cc)
