= Inboard brake =

Automobile brake

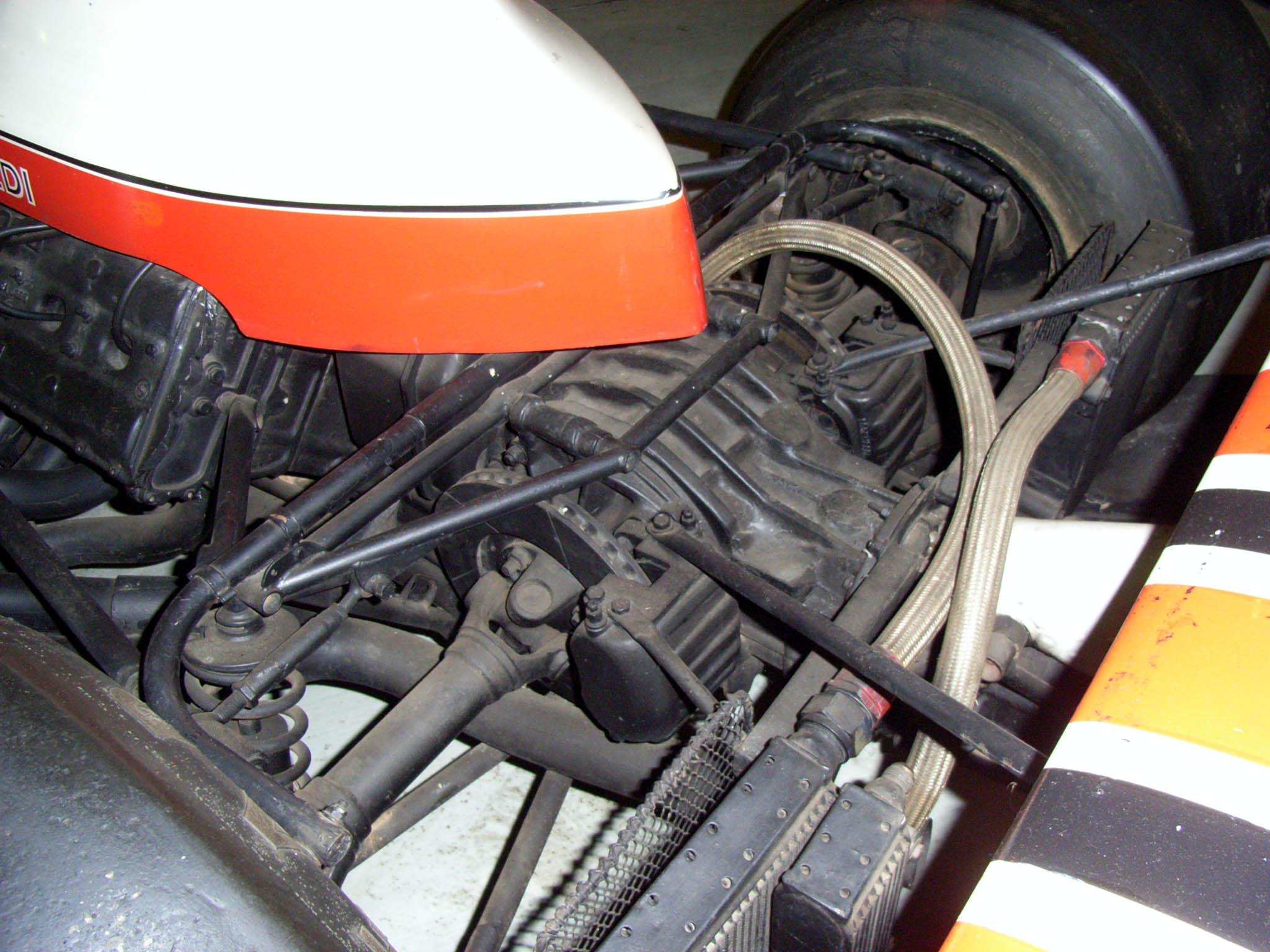
The McLaren M23's rear brake calipers nestle between the universal joints and the transaxle, with their calipers mounted directly to the transaxle housing

An inboard brake is an automobile brake mounted on the chassis of the vehicle, rather than directly on a wheel hub. It began with drum brakes and evolved to disks, and creates a reduction in the unsprung mass (by relocating the brake discs and calipers from the wheel hubs to rear drive components). It also improves brake performance by applying its force directly to the chassis, rather than being transferred to it through the suspension arms.

== Description ==
Inboard brakes began as drum brakes fitted to drive components in the rear of a vehicle (such as a drive shaft, or directly to a differential or transaxle). Originally a racing feature, they also appeared on such high-performance sports cars as the iconic Mercedes-Benz 300 SL "Gullwing". With the introduction of disc brakes they were found inboard on some racers and high-end sports cars and grand turismos (notably the Jaguar E-type). Most applications have been on rear-wheel drive vehicles, although they also have been used in four-wheel drive and some front-wheel drives. A rare few rear wheel drive racing cars (like the Lotus 72) have also used inboard front discs, requiring a front brake shaft to be added to gain the overall unsprung mass and braking torque advantages.

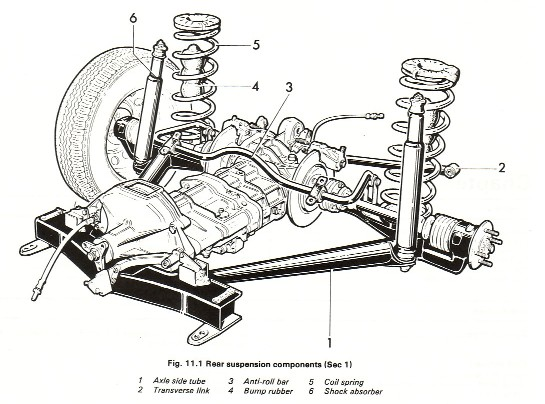
Alfa Romeo 75 rear transaxle subassembly

Excepting the case of vehicles with beam axles and vehicles having no suspension, in practice it is normal for inboard brakes to be mounted rigidly with respect to the body of the vehicle, often to the differential casing. This is done to move the weight of the braking mechanism from being carried by the wheels directly as unsprung mass, to being carried indirectly by the wheels via the suspension as sprung mass. This then necessitates a means of transferring braking torque from the brake mechanism to the wheel, which is capable of operating despite the relative movement between body and wheel. Driven wheels already have shafting which serve this purpose so there is no penalty for them, but undriven wheels require adding their own brake shaft.

The benefit of such a system is primarily the reduction of unsprung mass, which improves handling and ride. Mechanically, the suspension does not have to resist twisting when the brakes are applied. The wheels don't enclose the brake mechanism allowing greater flexibility in wheel offset, and placement of suspension members. It is also much easier to protect the brake mechanism from the outside environment, and from water, dust, and oil. In addition, flexible brake lines may be replaced by rigid lines, allowing increases in brake fluid pressure, and larger disks - with greater cooling - may be fitted than within the constraints of a wheel.

The mechanical disadvantages are largely those of added complexity, and poorer cooling, resulting in brake fade and potentially requiring special ducting. Undriven wheels also require their own brake shaft. Inboard brakes also affect anti-pitch suspension geometry.

There can be practical difficulties in servicing the brake mechanism. Instead of simply removing a wheel to renew pads and discs, the entire rear of a vehicle may need to be jacked up, or the car put on a lift. Additionally renewing brake discs can require dismantling the half axle. This greatly discourages their use in motorsport, and the additional time makes for greater labour cost in servicing.

This system was more common in the 1960s, found even on the Citroën 2CV. The Hummer H1 is one of the few modern vehicles fitted with inboard brakes, to accommodate each wheel's portal gear system.

Hybrid electric vehicles may be considered to have partial inboard braking, as the motor–generator(s) used for regenerative braking are usually mounted inboard.

== Examples ==
Cars with inboard brakes at the driven end include:

- Alfa Romeo Alfasud, front wheels have inboard discs.
- Alfa Romeo Alfetta, Alfetta GT/GTV, GTV6, Giulietta (116), 75 / Milano, 90, SZ/RZ
- Audi 100
- British Racing Motors: Some BRM racing cars had a single inboard disc brake, acting on both back wheels.
- Citroën 2CV, DS, GS, SM, Ami, Dyane, Axel and other Citroën models
- Cord L-29
- Corvette Stingray (concept car) not really a concept but a racing model.
- DKW Junior plus other models
- Devin SS
- Ferrari 312 Formula One car
- Hummer H1
- Jaguar E-Type, Jaguar XJ (until XJ40), Jaguar XJ-S, Jaguar Mark X
- Lancia Aprilia, Aurelia, Flaminia
- Lotus Twelve racing car, and most other racing Lotuses after.
- Lotus Elite, Elan and Esprit
- Maserati, Quattroporte II (AM123, 1974–1978)
- Mercedes-Benz W196 and 300SLR
- Monteverdi Hai 450 SS
- NSU Ro80
- Oltcit Club
- Rover P6
- Subaru G (FF1 had inboard drums front only)
- TVR Tasmin
- Volkswagen K70

== See also ==
- Transmission brake
