= Rodae =

Automobile manufacturer (1994–2008)

RODAE Automobile Craiova S.A.
- Type: Joint venture
- Industry: Automotive industry
- Predecessor: Oltena
- Founded: 1994
- Defunct: 2008
- Fate: Change of ownership
- Successor: Ford Romania
- Headquarters: Craiova, Romania
- Products: Automobiles
- Owner: Daewoo Heavy Industries (51%); S.C. Automobile Craiova S.A. (49%)

Rodae (officially RODAE Automobile Craiova S.A., and later Daewoo Automobile Romania S.A.) was a joint venture between S.C. Automobile Craiova S.A. and Daewoo Heavy Industries that started in 1994.

== History ==
In November 1994, Daewoo opened a production line in Romania, becoming the country's most important foreign investor, by establishing a joint venture, created by Automobile Craiova and the South Korean Daewoo group.

In 2006, Daewoo Automobile Craiova S.A. bought back 51% of the shares owned by the Korean company, which became 100% owned by the Romanian state.

In 2008, it was sold to Ford of Europe, a division of Ford Motor Company.

== Models ==
- Rodae Club (1994–1996)
- Rodae Club 12 CS (1994–1995)
- Daewoo Cielo (1996–2007)
- Daewoo Espero (1996–2002)
- Daewoo Tico (1998–2002)
- Daewoo Leganza (1998–2002)
- Daewoo Nubira (1998–2008)
- Daewoo Matiz (1999–2008)
- Daewoo Tacuma (2002–2007)
