= Citroën Visa =

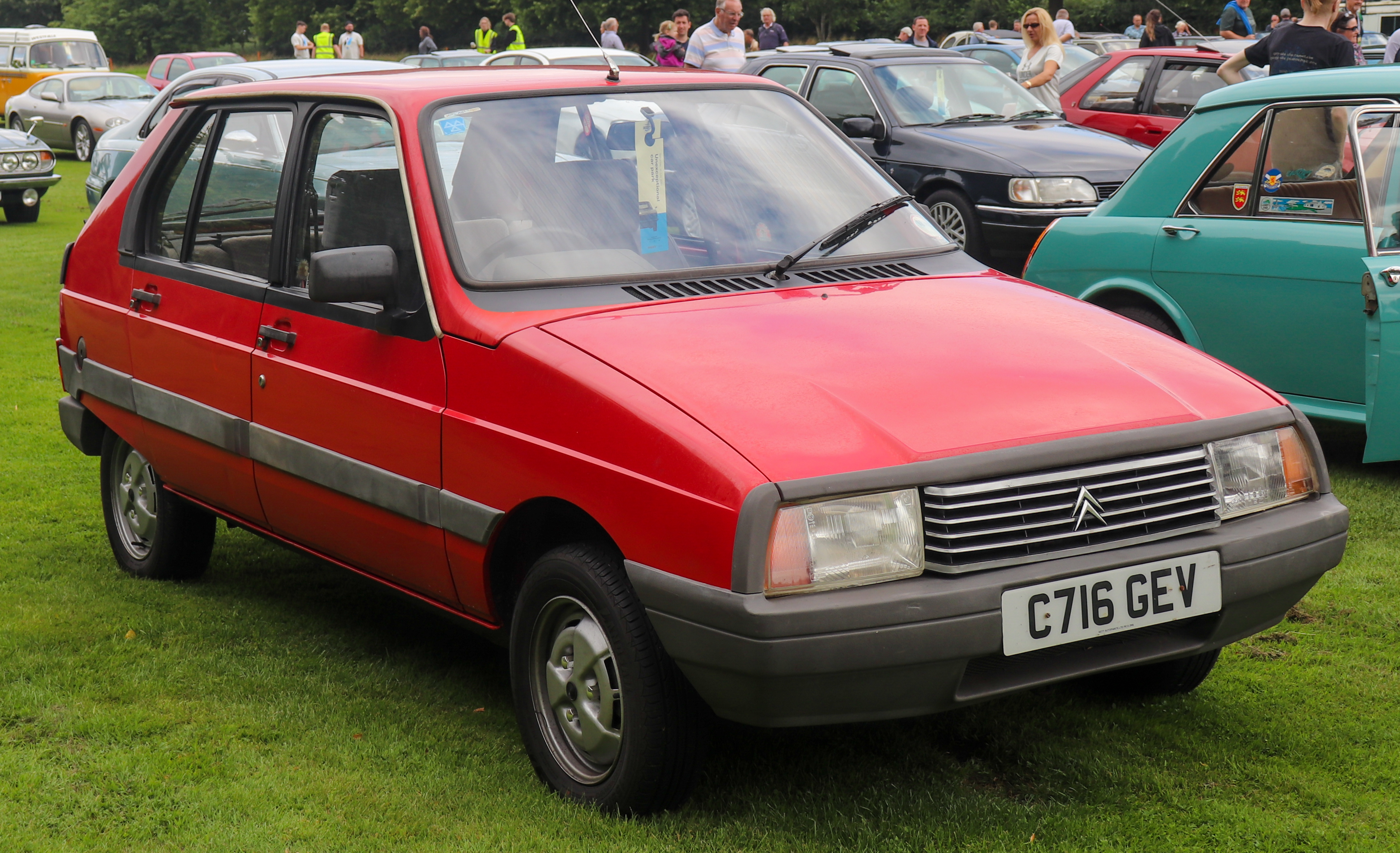

Overview
- Manufacturer: Citroën
- Also called: Wuling LZW 7100/ Wuling Visa (PRC)
- Production: September 1978–1988; 1991–1994 (China)
- Assembly: France: Rennes (Rennes Plant); France: Cerizay (Heuliez: Décapotable); Belgium: Forest; Portugal: Mangualde (Mangualde Plant); Spain: Vigo (Vigo Plant); Yugoslavia: Koper (Cimos)

Body and chassis
- Class: Supermini (B)
- Body style: 5-door hatchback 4-door cabriolet
- Layout: FF layout F4 layout
- Related: Citroën C15; Karenjy Visa (RM); Citroën LN; Peugeot 104; Talbot Samba; Citroën Axel / Oltcit Club

Powertrain
- Engine: 652 cc V06 air-cooled H2; 954 cc XV I4; 1,124 cc XW I4; 1,219 cc XZ I4; 1,360 cc XYI4; 1,580 cc XU5 I4; 1,769 cc XUD7 diesel I4
- Transmission: 4 or 5-speed manual

Dimensions
- Wheelbase: 2,436 mm (95.9 in)
- Length: 3,690 mm (145.3 in)
- Width: 1,530 mm (60.2 in)
- Height: 1,410 mm (55.5 in)
- Curb weight: 870 kg (1,918 lb)

Chronology
- Predecessor: Citroën Ami; Citroën Dyane
- Successor: Citroën AX

The Citroën Visa is a supermini car which was manufactured and marketed by Citroën from 1978 to 1988. It has a front-engine, front-wheel-drive layout with two body styles: A five-door hatchback and a four-door semiconvertible. 1,254,390 examples were ultimately manufactured over a single generation, with a single facelift (1981). It was produced in both petrol and diesel variants. The car was also assembled in China as the Liuzhou Wuling LZW 7100 minicar; Chinese production started in 1991 and finished in 1994.

Citroën commissioned Heuliez to produce a Visa convertible variant, marketed as the Décapotable (1984), and a box van variant (1985–2005) was marketed as the Citroën C15. A saloon car variant was prototyped but never manufactured.

== Development ==
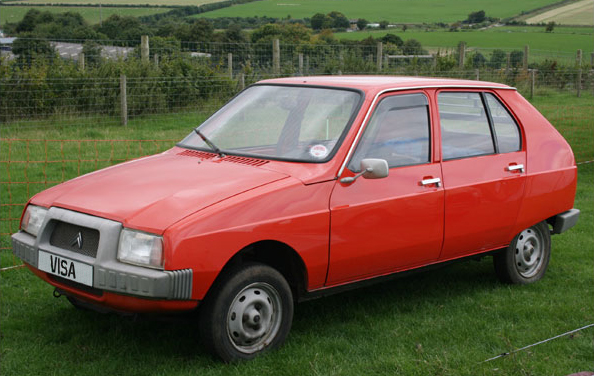
Citroën Visa MkI

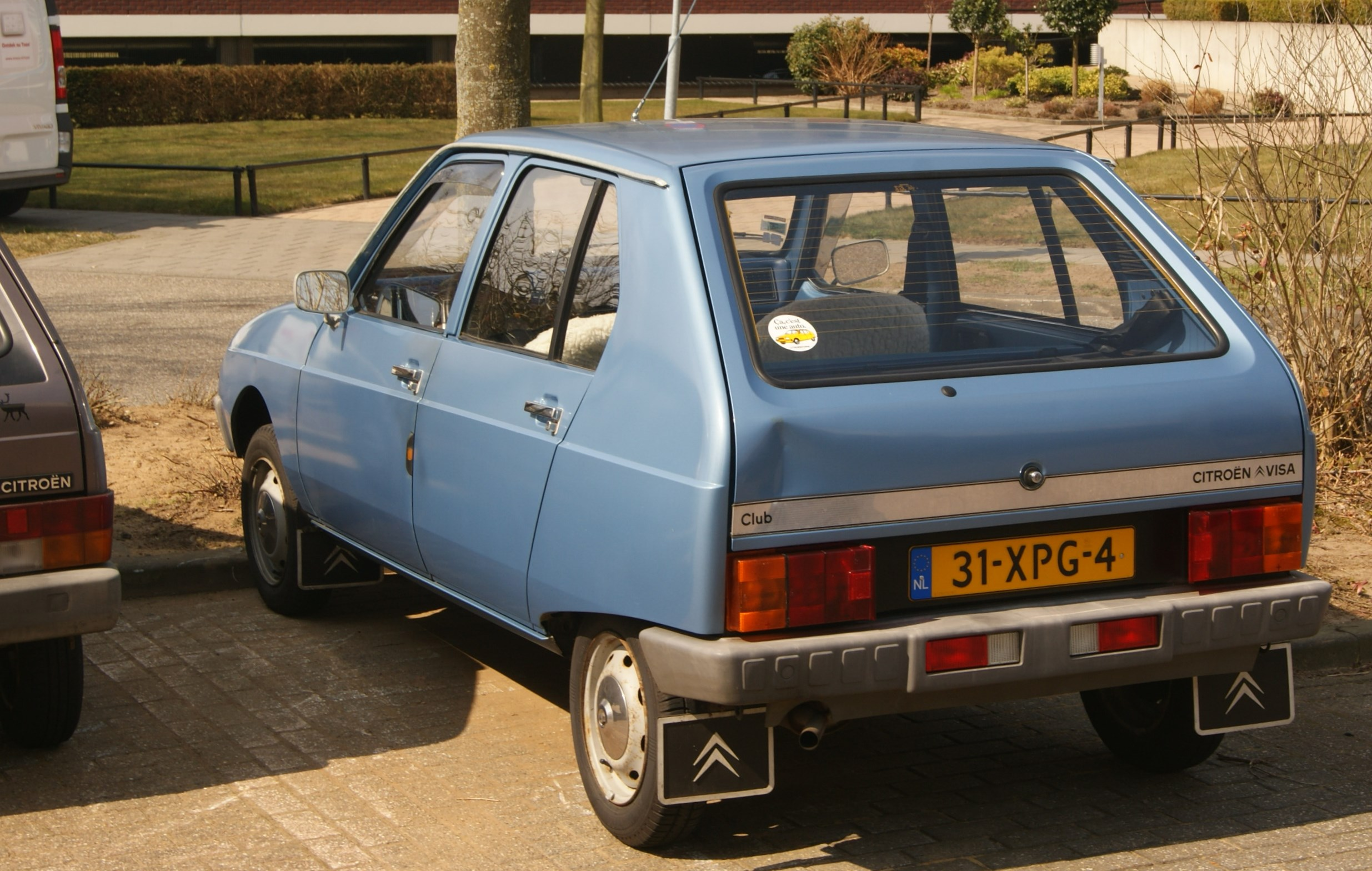
Mk1 rear view

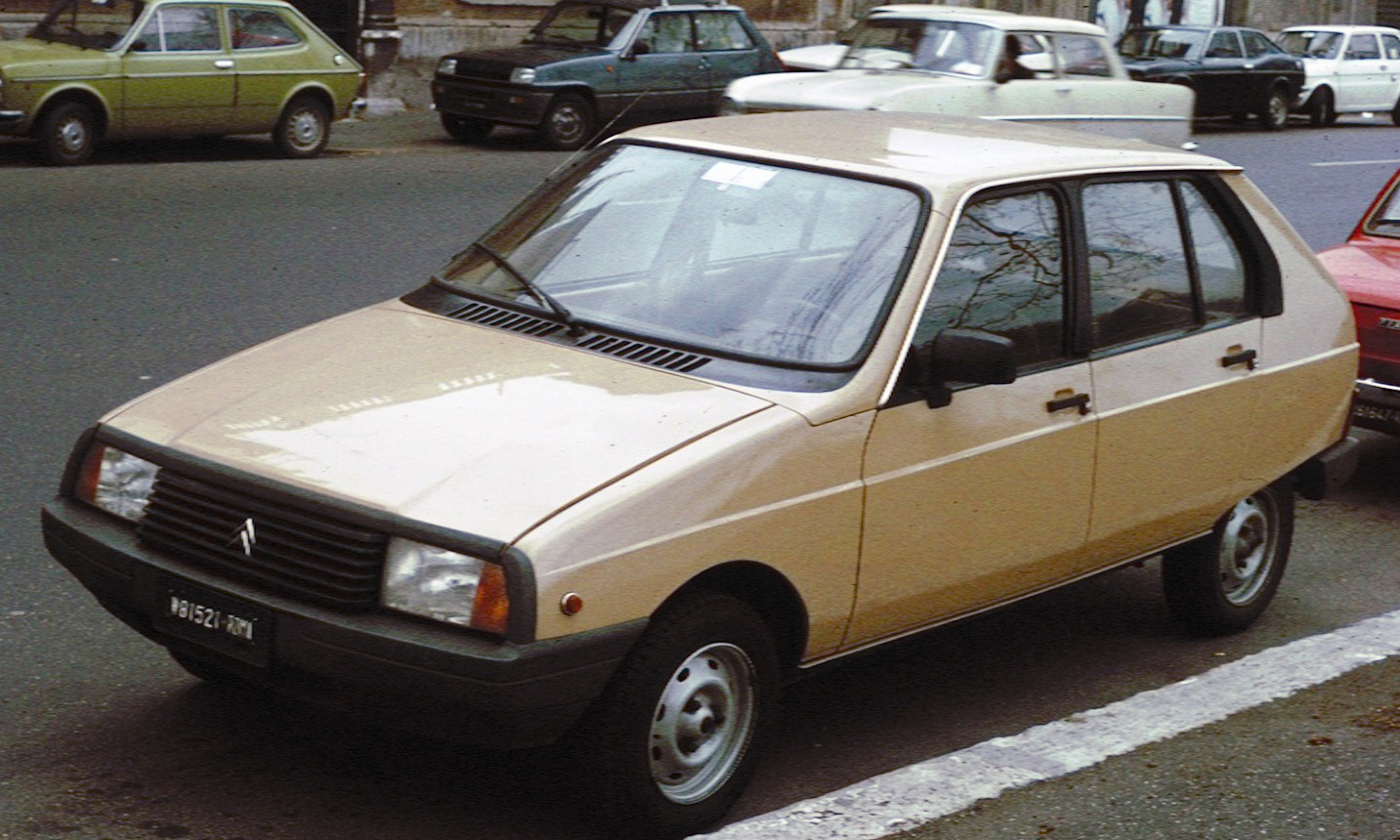
Citroën Visa Spécial Mk2

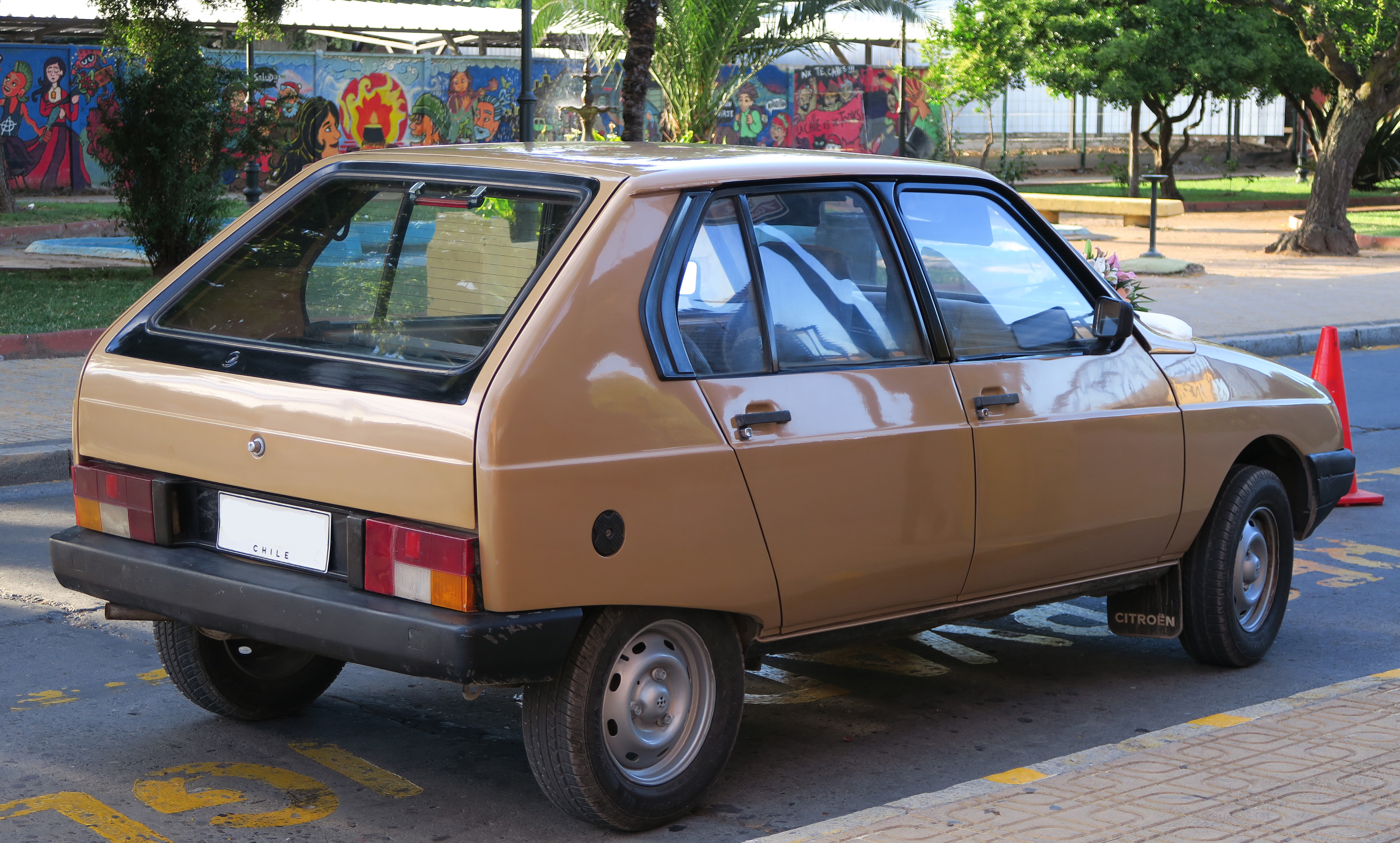
Mk2 rear view

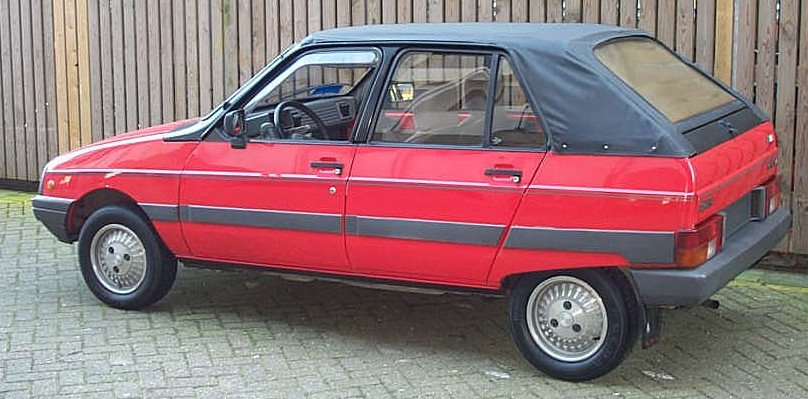
Citroën Visa Cabriolet - side profile

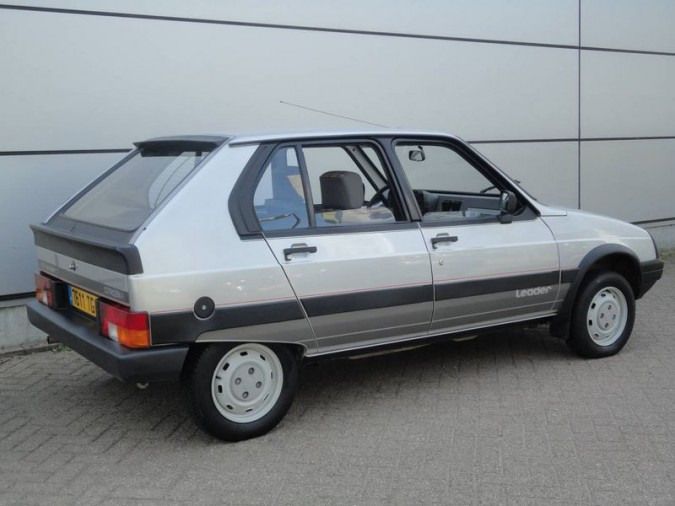
Citroën Visa 'Leader' special edition 1.7l Diesel

In 1965 Robert Opron began working on the Citroën G-mini prototype and project EN101, a replacement for the 2CV using its flat twin engine and intended to launch in 1970. The advanced space efficient designs with compact exterior dimensions and an aerodynamic drag co-efficient Cd of 0.32, were never fully developed because of negative feedback from potential clients.

A subsequent program, the Citroën Prototype Y, was developed in the early 1970s in co-operation with Fiat, to replace the 2CV-based Citroën Ami — using lessons from the Citroën G-mini and EN101 projects. Prototype Y used the Fiat 127 platform with the pioneering transverse front-engine, front wheel drive layout Fiat had test-marketed in the Autobianchi Primula.

When cooperation with Fiat ended, Citroën designed its own platform, and subsequent to the takeover of Citroën by Peugeot in the wake of the 1974 oil crisis, the renamed "Projet VD (Voiture Diminuée)" became the Citroën Visa, incorporating the floor pan of the Peugeot 104 and using the 104 engine, transmission (under the engine) and chassis. The Visa thus became the first model under PSA Peugeot Citroën's platform-sharing policy.

In 1984, the original Citroën platform design from "Project Y" emerged as the Romanian Oltcit Club, using a Citroën Visa flat-twin engine and Citroën GS-based gearbox or the GS flat-four engine and gearbox. This was also marketed in Western Europe as the flat-four (only) Citroën Axel to recoup Citroën's Romanian investment, which the Romanian government could not repay. The resulting vehicle exhibited build quality issues, with 60,184 cars ultimately manufactured.

== Model history and design ==
From its launch in September 1978, the front-wheel drive Visa was available in "Spécial" and "Club" models with a mapped electronic ignition (652 cc, 2-cylinder), and a "Super E" model (the 11RE after 1984), with the advanced Peugeot 1124 cc Douvrin engine / PSA X engine, a four-cylinder "Suitcase engine" — all aluminium alloy, chain driven overhead cam, with gearbox in the sump, sharing engine oil, mounted almost on its side. The 1124 cc was as economical as the Citroën 2CV-derived twin, but with much better performance. The flat-twin engine was mounted longitudinally; the four-cylinder engines were installed transversally. Later on it had 1219 cc (Super X) and then 954 cc (10E after 1984) and 1360 cc (1983 Visa GT and 14TRS after 1985) versions of the same engine. The original Visa's engines, while of Peugeot origins, were modified by Citroën's engineers with the aim of increasing fuel economy and responsiveness. The results were very limited and by the time of the introduction of the 1.4-litre models the engines were taken over wholesale from Peugeot without modifications.

The Visa featured a soft but well-damped, long-travel, fully independent suspension (Coil-sprung MacPherson struts at the front, with coil sprung trailing arms at the rear) that contributed to a soft ride similar to the Citroën 2CV, but with less extreme body roll. New for 1983 was the Visa Super E GL, which offered more complete equipment and a redesigned, more comfortable two-piece rear seat. The two seats were easily removed (without requiring tools) to increase luggage capability. For model year 1983 the most powerful Visa yet, the Visa GT, arrived. In addition to the 80-PS engine, it offered alloy wheels with Michelin TRX tyres, spoilers, sideskirts and trim, special colors, and a more sporting suspension tuning than what was normal for Citroën. In early 1985 the limited production Visa 14 S Tonic arrived, a version using the GT's engine and transmission coupled with an all-white appearance similar to the Visa Crono but at a price not much higher than the basic Visa 11 RE. Only 2000 Tonics were made.

In spring 1984 the diesel version was added. The Visa 17D and 17RD used the famously rugged and refined, class-leading 1769 cc XUD diesel and transmission from the Peugeot 205. The powertrain required too wide a track for the original engine compartment and wings, so the front wings were extended with large black plastic wheel arch panels. The spare wheel that in smaller petrol engine versions was mounted on top of the flat or near horizontal engine, was bolted to the otherwise flat boot floor, compromising luggage space. In continental Europe, a basic diesel van the 'Visa Enterprise' was sold that used the normal Visa bodyshell with the rear doors welded shut. This version mounted a space saver spare wheel under the bonnet, atop the diesel engine.

At the Paris Salon 1984, for model year 1985, the 1.4 L TRS was presented. The Visa 14 TRS, was produced for two years (1985–1987), shared its engine with the Citroën BX14 and receiving a favourable review by CAR magazine. In early 1985 the Visa GTI, fitted with a 1580 cc engine, was introduced. This would be the fastest Visa offered with a top speed of 188 or 192 km/h depending on the engine version.

Between 1985 and 1987 the 1.1 litre petrol and 1.7 litre diesel "Leader" special editions were marketed. Near the end of its production life, a 55 PS (40 kW) catalyzed version of the 1360 cc engine was added for markets with stricter emissions standards.

No automatic gearbox version was produced.

Production of the Visa finished near the end of 1988, when the five-door version of the Citroën AX was launched.

=== Dashboard satellites and interior ===
The Visa driver controls were located in two pods flanking the steering wheel and were marketed as PRN Lunule ("Satellites"; P=Pluie – Rain, R=Route – Road, N=Nuit – Night). Controls for wipers, washers, horn, indicators, headlamps and flashers were mounted ergonomically on a cylindrical unit with heating and ventilation controls using laterally arcing sliders were located oppositely on a flat control pod — all within finger-tip reach. In 1979 Popular Science described the system as using a "finger-tip control drum."

In March 1981 the Visa received a facelift, designed by Heuliez, retaining the original interior and the "PRN Satellite" controls. It was now referred to as the Visa II. In the summer of 1984 (for the 1985 model year) the Visa was updated again and received a new dashboard, instruments, and switchgear, retaining its monospoke steering wheel. The turn signals were now self-cancelling, making this the first Citroën to be equipped with this near-universal feature.

The curved sides of the Visa's windscreen enabled the use of a very large single wiper on the long narrow windscreen. The front of the revised car was designed to aerodynamically reduce the deposition of dirt on the headlights, and to reduce the risk of stone chips to the headlights, bonnet and windscreen.

The Visa's heating and ventilation system, (even though it used only a water control valve for temperature control and not air mixing), could provide cold air from fascia side vents to the face while warming the car. The central directable fascia vents could be heated and angled, so that they could be pointed directly at the windscreen in front of the driver, to keep it clear in extreme misting conditions. There was also an additional mid level vent, to blow air between the front seats to the back of the car.

The Visa's rear parcel shelf was in two hinged sections, one in the car, the other on the tailgate, to allow objects that were slightly too tall to still fit without removing the shelf. When carrying larger loads, the part of the shelf attached to the tailgate could be folded up, and fixed with the elasticated support strings, to protect the rear window and heated rear screen elements.

=== Visa Décapotable ===
Citroën commissioned a four-door convertible Visa from Heuliez in 1984. Marketed as the Visa Décapotable, this was one of very few cabrio coaches built in the period: the bodywork features a hybrid fixed-profile convertible with the doors and window frames remaining intact. Based on the 11RE the convertible was heavier and slower than its hatchback counterpart and cost about 50 percent more; the markup was similar to what Fiat and Ford charged for their full convertible versions of the Ritmo and Escort.

== Engines ==
Model Range	Engine	Displacement cc	Fuel feed	Power/rpm	Torque/rpm	Drive	Standard Number Manual Gears	Kerb Weight	Speed max	Acceler. 0–100 km/h (0-62 mph) (seconds)	Consum. (l/100 km)	Production years	Engine design
Petrol Versions
Visa Special/Club/ Entreprise/base	V06	652	Carburetor	34.5 PS (25 kW; 34 hp)/5250	49 N⋅m (36 lbf⋅ft)/3500	FWD	M/4	745 kg (1,642 lb)	128 km/h (80 mph)	29.3	5.4	1978-87	Air-cooled, boxer twin
Visa 10E	XV	954	Carburetor	45 PS (33 kW; 44 hp)/6000	66 N⋅m (49 lbf⋅ft)/3000	FWD	M/4	810 kg (1,786 lb)	133 km/h (83 mph)	19.8	6.6	1986-88^{1}	Water-cooled, inline-four
Visa Super/Super E/ L / 11 E/11 RE/Entreprise	XW7	1124	Carburetor	50 PS (37 kW; 49 hp)/5500	84 N⋅m (62 lbf⋅ft)/2500	FWD	M/4	800 kg (1,764 lb)	144 km/h (89 mph)	16.6	7.7	1978-88	Water-cooled, inline-four
Visa Cabriolet	XW7	1124	Carburetor	50 PS (37 kW; 49 hp)/5500	84 N⋅m (62 lbf⋅ft)/2500	FWD	M/4	813 kg (1,792 lb)	137 km/h (85 mph)	20.7	6.5	1983-85	Water-cooled, inline-four
Visa Super X	XZ7G	1219	Carburetor	64 PS (47 kW; 63 hp)/6000	91 N⋅m (67 lbf⋅ft)/3000	FWD	M/4	815 kg (1,797 lb)	155 km/h (96 mph)	14.0	8.3	1980-82	Water-cooled, inline-four
Visa 14 TRS	XY7	1360	Carburetor	60 PS (44 kW; 59 hp)/5000	105 N⋅m (77 lbf⋅ft)/2500	FWD	M/4	830 kg (1,830 lb)	153 km/h (95 mph)	14.0	6.3	1985-87	Water-cooled, inline-four
Visa GT/Chrono^{2}/Tonic	XY8	1360	Carburetor	80 PS (59 kW; 79 hp)/5800^{3}	109 N⋅m (80 lbf⋅ft)/2800	FWD	M/5	830 kg (1,830 lb)	168 km/h (104 mph)	10.9	7.3	1982-85	Water-cooled, inline-four
Visa Chrono^{4}	XYR	1360	Carburetor	93 PS (68 kW; 92 hp)/5800	125 N⋅m (92 lbf⋅ft)/4500	FWD	M/5	850 kg (1,874 lb)	173 km/h (107 mph)	10.2	8.5	1982	Water-cooled, inline-four
Visa 1000 Pistes	-	1360	Carburetor	112 PS (82 kW; 110 hp)/6800	131 N⋅m (97 lbf⋅ft)/4500	AWD	M/5	850 kg (1,874 lb)	183 km/h (114 mph)	8.7	9	1983	Water-cooled, inline-four
Visa GTi	XU5J	1580	Electronic; Multi Port Injection	105 PS (77 kW; 104 hp)/6250	134 N⋅m (99 lbf⋅ft)/4000	FWD	M/5	870 kg (1,918 lb)	188 km/h (117 mph)	9.1	7.4	1985-86	Water-cooled, inline-four
Visa GTi	XU5 JA/K	1580	Electronic; Multi Port Injection	115 PS (85 kW; 113 hp)/6250	134 N⋅m (99 lbf⋅ft)/4000	FWD	M/5	870 kg (1,918 lb)	192 km/h (119 mph)	8.8	7.8	1986-88	Water-cooled, inline-four
Diesel Versions
Visa 17 D/17 RD/ 17 D Entreprise	XUD7/K	1769	Naturally Aspirated; Mechanical; Indirect Injection	60 PS (44 kW; 59 hp)/4600	110 N⋅m (81 lbf⋅ft)/2000	FWD	M/4	890 kg (1,962 lb)	152 km/h (94 mph)	15.9	5.2	1984-88	Water-cooled, inline-four
Note:^{1}As early as 1984 in some markets^{2}It is understood the Chrono not solely intended to France and introduced in 1983^{3}72 PS at 6000 rpm for the Swiss market^{4}4 Designed exclusively for the French market

== Sporting Variants ==
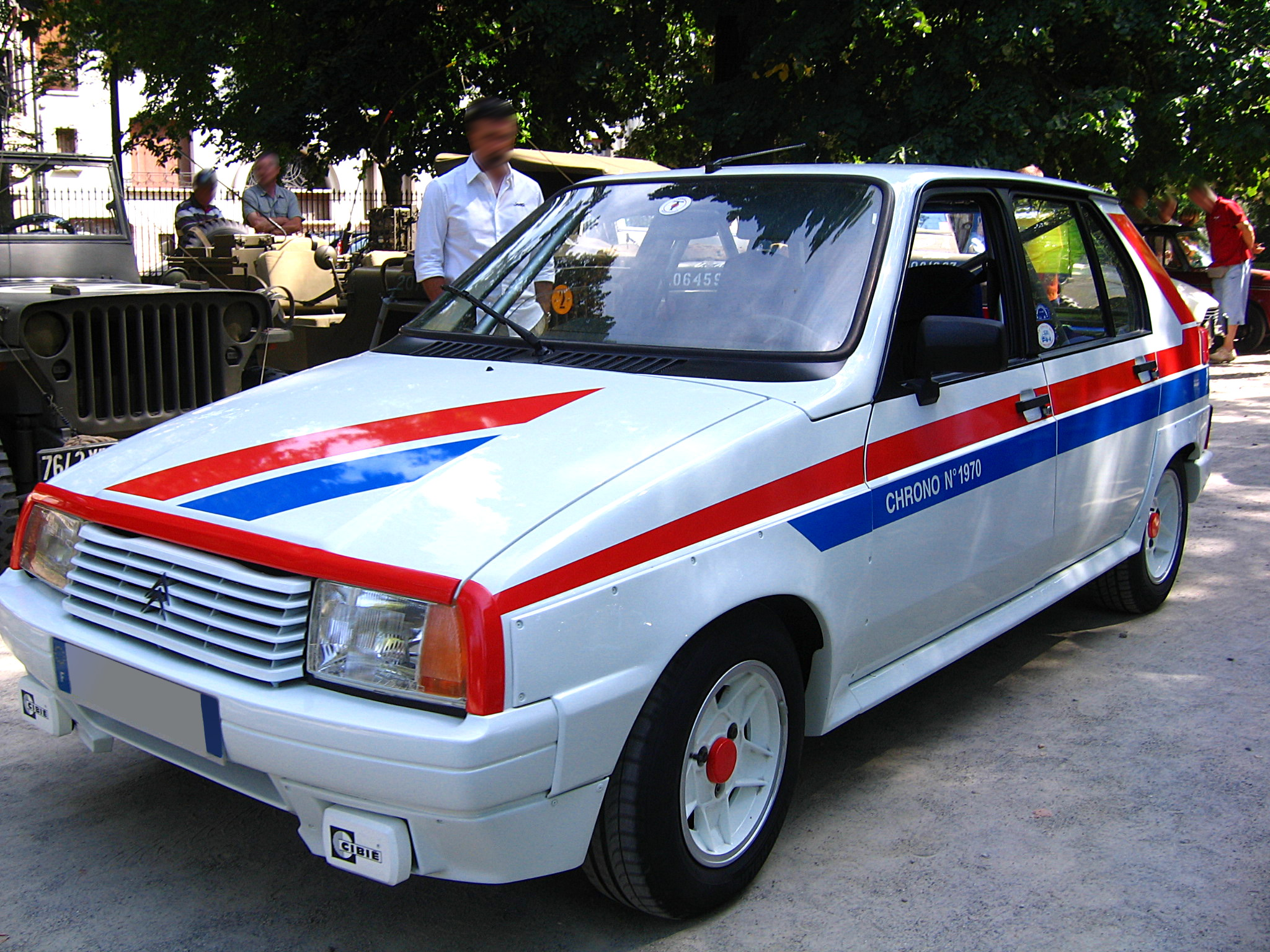
1982 Citroën Visa Chrono

=== GT ===
The first mass-produced sport variant of the Visa was the GT in 1982. It was powered by the 1360 cc XY engine with two downdraft Weber single-barrel carburetors and produced. A lower power single-carb engine was produced for Switzerland. In 1985 a limited production 'GT Tonic' version was released with the addition of a sportier body kit incorporating the riveted wheel arches from the 'Chrono' motorsport model.

=== Trophèe ===
Built in late 1981 the Visa Trophée was produced in limited numbers for homologation in the Group B rally category. It used the 1219 cc XZ engine as used in the Visa Super X but with heavily modified cylinder head, breathing through two side-draft Weber 40 DCOE carburetors and producing an impressive 100 PS (74 kW). The Trophée was designed specifically for the entry level rally car market such as privateers and dealership teams. It had weight savings over the GT such as lighter weight fibre glass body panels, re-designed dashboard and lexan side windows allowing it to weigh in at just under 700 kg. Rally versions were sometimes increased in capacity up to 1299 cc and could produce up to 140 PS (103 kW).

=== Chrono ===
The Visa Chrono was released in 1982 intended for competition in the same vein as the Trophée but in the larger capacity group B engine class. It used the same 1360 cc XY engine as the GT but with a modified, larger valve head and two double-barrel side draft Solex C35 carburetors and produced 93 PS (68 kW). Aside from the exterior body decals other modifications to the car such as the bodykit, with Cibie fog lights, and dashboard also differentiated it from the GT. 2160 were produced for the French market and a further 1600 produced for continental Europe outside France. The non-French models did not have the Solex carbs but the GT's Weber carb and head set up and produced 80 PS (59 kW).

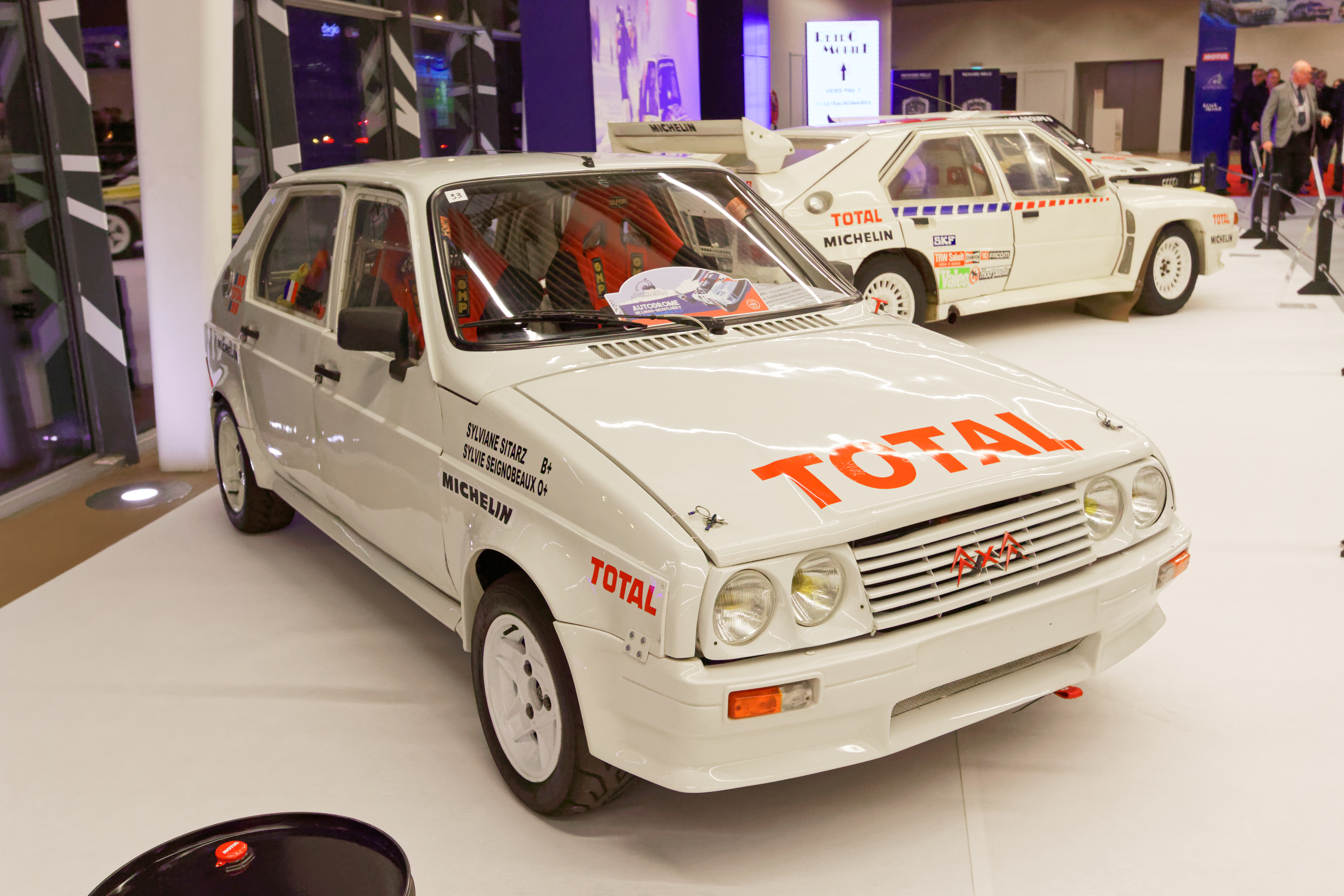
Competition-spec Visa Mille Pistes

=== Mille Pistes ===
The Visa "Mille Pistes" was a four-wheel drive version of the Visa homologated for the group B B/10 class. The production versions were known as the Visa 1000 Pistes 4 x 4 of which 200 were built for homologation in 1984. The production version was essentially a 4WD Chrono with the same 1360 cc engine but on twin Weber 40 DCOE carbs and producing 112 PS (82 kW). The Mille Pistes received its name after a Visa 4 x 4 competing in the experimental category won this rally in 1983, with Wambergue and Laverne driving. The Evolution models were modified by Denis Mathiot; the displacement was increased to 1440 cc and the resulting power ranged from 135 to 140 PS (99 to 103 kW), with the weight down to 750 kg (1,653 lb).

=== GTi ===
At the Paris Salon 1984, for model year 1985, the high-performance 1.6 GTi was presented. The GTi used the 1.6 L fuel injected XU5J engine and transmission combination in 105 or 115 PS (77 or 85 kW) versions, borrowed from the successful Peugeot 205 GTI. The car used plastic wheel arch extensions to hide a wider track that was needed to accommodate the larger engine, something that also had to be done for the diesel model. It received good reviews about its ride, performance and roadholding, but due to its older, failed facelift looks, and its five doors it was not a big seller, even with a much lower price than the chic 205.

== Chinese production ==
Liuzhou Wuling began assembling Visas in 1991 from kits imported from Europe. Called the Wuling LZW 7100, production in small volumes continued until 1994; official registrations in that period totaled 901 but total production was 1,314 examples. Wuling did not have a license to assemble cars and the Chinese government halted sales, leaving the company with a number of cars on their hands which were still in storage as late as 1997. It is unknown if the kits were sent from Citroën's Spanish or French plants, but they used the Visa Diesel's bodywork and were sent to China complete aside from engines. Liuzhou Wuling bought three-cylinder, 1-litre 376Q engines of Daihatsu origins from the nearby Tianjin factory. These produce 48 PS (35.3 kW) at 5,600 rpm, enough for a 130 km/h (81 mph) top speed. The Wuling's diesel bodyshell mounted the spare tyre beneath the boot floor rather than in the engine compartment as on petrol-engined Visas.
