= Citroën Prototype Y =

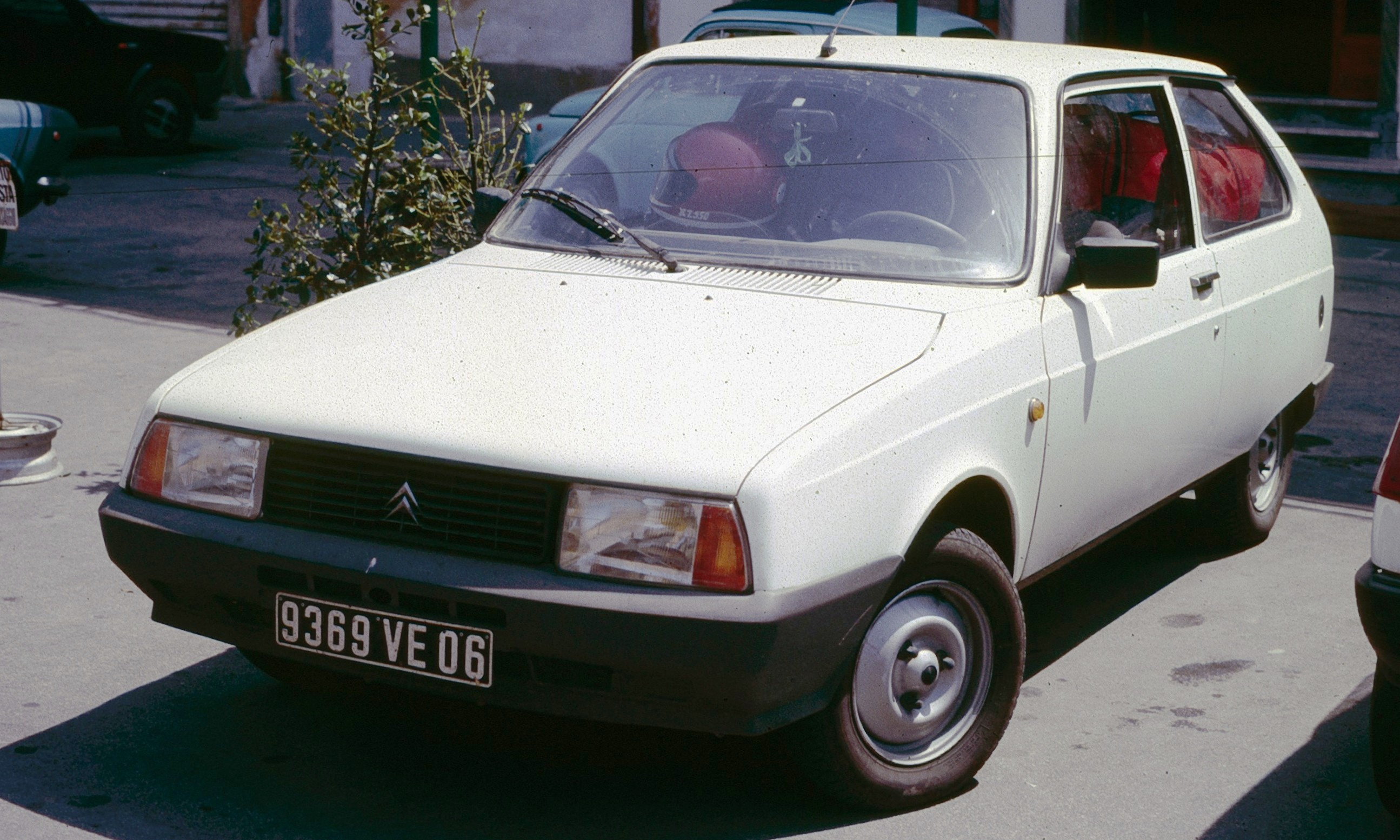
- Citroën Axel, a production model based on the Prototype Y

Overview
- Manufacturer: Citroën
- Assembly: France

The Citroën Prototype Y was a project to develop a replacement for the Citroën Ami, conducted by the French car manufacturer Citroën in the early seventies. It built on the Citroën G-mini and EN101 projects. It was superseded by project Citroën VD (VD standing for Voiture Diminuée).

The design was sold to Romania and became the Oltcit Club (and Citroën Axel for export markets). The link with Romania assisted with the Managing Director of Citroën being Bucharest born Georges Taylor.

== History ==
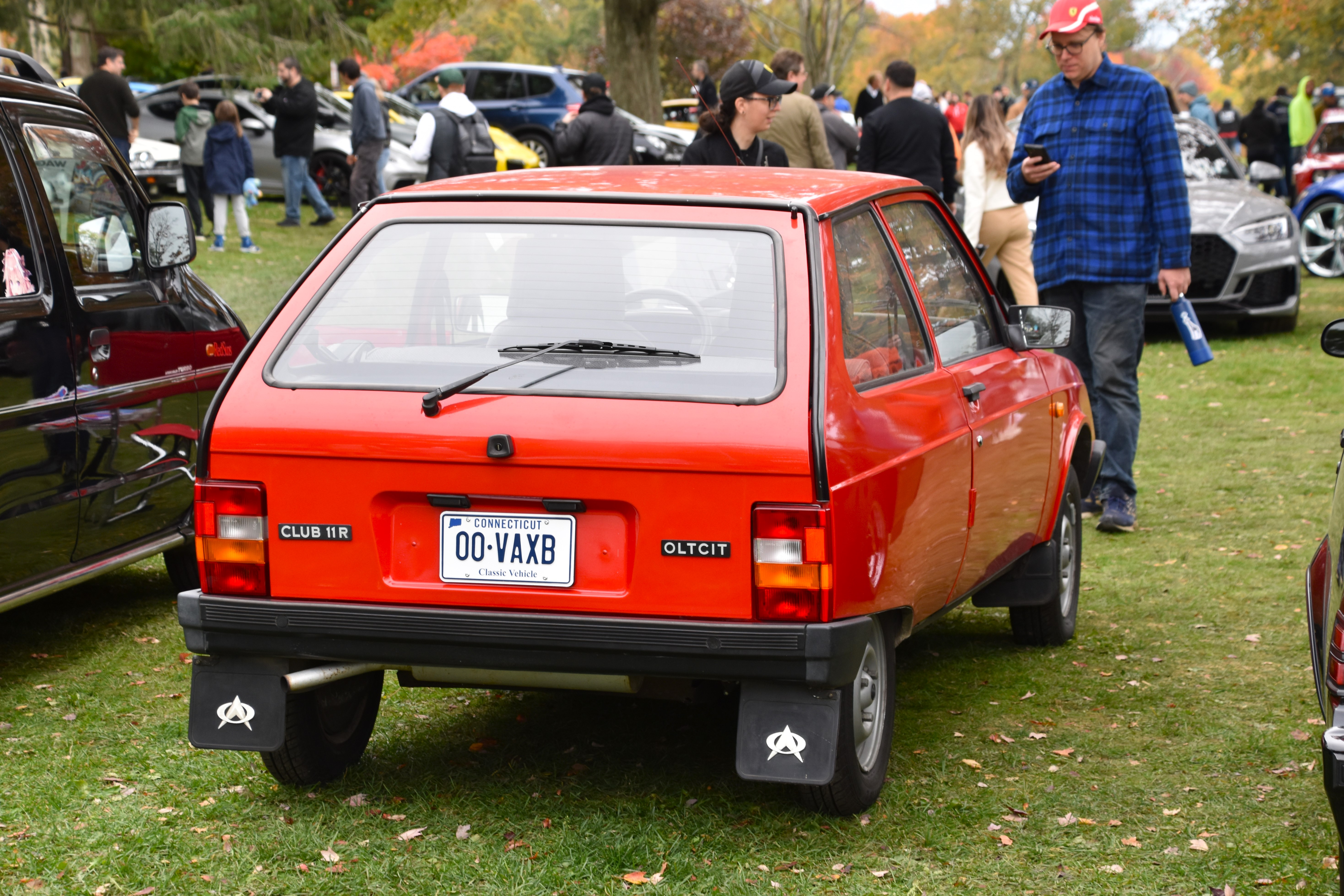
Oltcit Club rear view

From 1965 Robert Opron worked on the Citroën G-mini prototype and project EN101, a replacement for the 2CV, using the flat twin engine from the 2CV. It was supposed to launch in 1970. The advanced space efficient designs with very compact exterior dimensions and an aerodynamic drag co-efficient Cd of 0.32, were axed because of adverse feedback from potential clients.

The goal of Prototype Y was to give birth to a small, robust and modern car which would have fitted into the Citroën range between the 2CV and the GS.

The first prototypes were based on the Fiat 127 platform, since Citroën was pursuing at that time an alliance with Fiat (the only result of this alliance in the end was the Citroën C35 / Fiat 242). Later models employed a torsion bar suspension set up.

In 1974, Peugeot acquired Citroën, forming the PSA Group, and the project to replace the Ami was redefined as "Citroën VD", and then incorporated the floor pan of the Peugeot 104, thereby permitting the use of the 104 engine and transmission. The 5-door 104-based Citroën Visa thereby replaced the Prototype Y. There was also a badge-engineered Citroën version of the shorter wheelbase 3-door 104 with only minor changes from it — the Citroën LN/LNA.

The original design from Project Y was sold to Romania where it became the Oltcit Club, which has cosmetic similarities to the Visa, and was sold as the Citroën Axel in some Western European markets.
