= Karenjy =

Malagasy automobile manufacturer

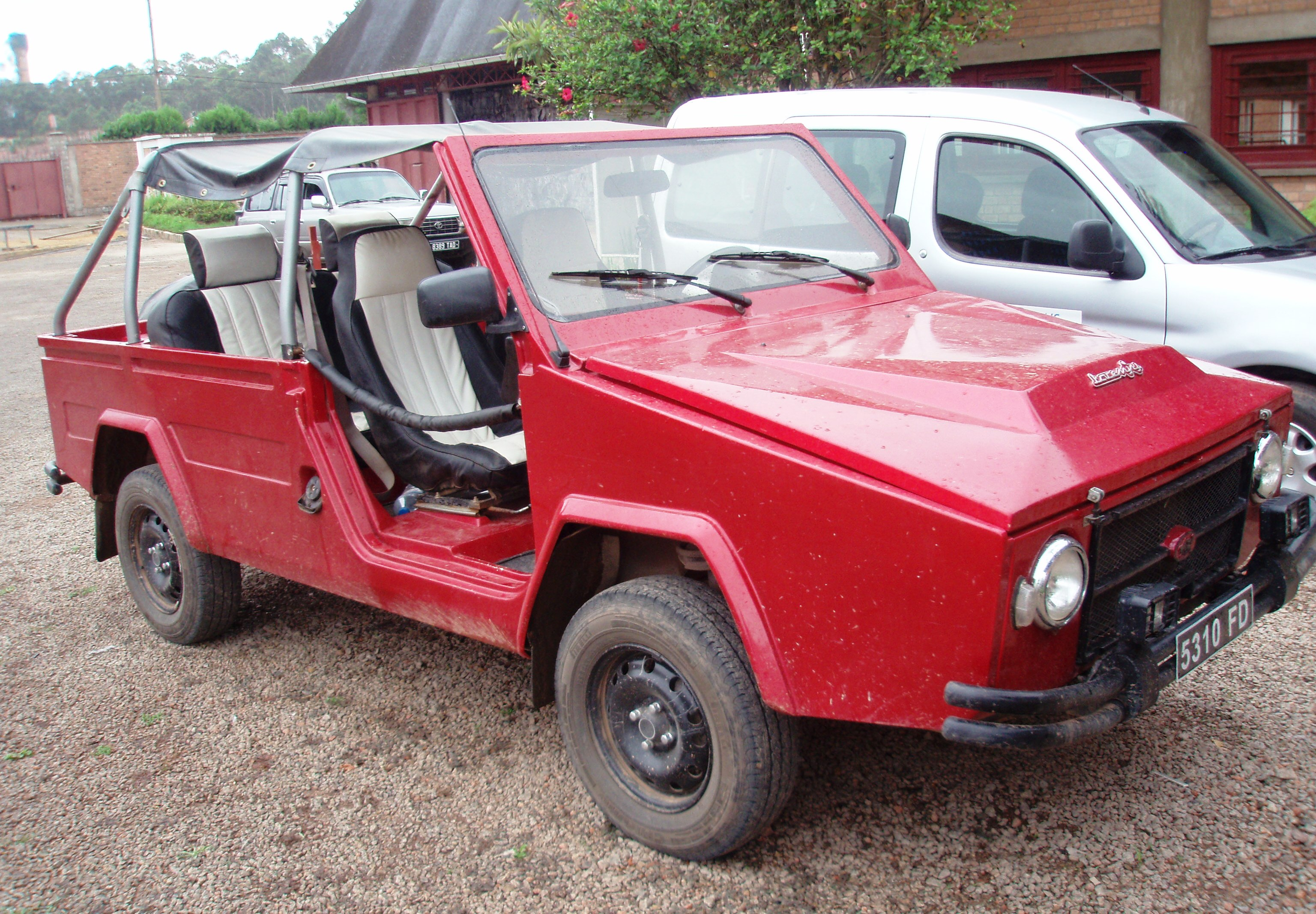
Karenjy Mazana

Karenjy is an automobile manufacturer based in Fianarantsoa, Madagascar. It produced vehicles from 1985 to 1995 when the company was dissolved. In January 2009, the company was re-established and production of the Karenjy Tily, which is based on the Renault 18 and Renault Express, commenced the same year.

The factory produced two popemobile. One for the arrival of Pope John Paul II in 1989, and one for the arrival of Pope Francis in Madagascar.

== Models ==
Two models were available in his productive life:

- MAZANA 4x4, diesel engine powered, available in sedan and convertible
- FOAKA 2x4 pickup, petrol engine. The chassis is welded, fitted with Renault mechanical parts and a locally produced fiberglass/composite body.
