= Unsprung mass =

Portion of a vehicle not supported by its suspension system

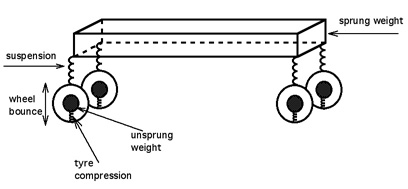
In this simplified diagram the wheels, tires, and suspension are all part of the vehicle's unsprung weight, with only its one-piece chassis/body constituting its sprung weight

The unsprung mass (colloquially unsprung weight) of a vehicle is the mass of the suspension, wheels or tracks (as applicable), and other components directly connected to them. This contrasts with the sprung mass (or weight) supported by the suspension, which includes the body and other components within or attached to it. Components of the unsprung mass include the wheel axles, wheel bearings, wheel hubs, tires, and a portion of the weight of driveshafts, springs, shock absorbers, and suspension links. Brakes that are mounted inboard (i.e. as on the drive shaft, and not part of the wheel or its hub) are part of a vehicle's sprung mass.

== Effects ==
The unsprung mass of a typical wheel/tire combination represents a trade-off between the pair's bump-absorbing/road-tracking ability and vibration isolation. Bumps and surface imperfections in the road cause tire compression, inducing a force on the unsprung mass. The unsprung mass then reacts to this force with movement of its own. The motion amplitude for small duration and amplitude bumps is inversely proportional to the weight. A lighter wheel which readily rebounds from road bumps will have more grip and more constant grip when tracking over an imperfect road. For this reason, lighter wheels are sought especially for high-performance applications. However, the lighter wheel will soak up less vibration. The irregularities of the road surface will transfer to the cabin through the suspension and hence ride quality and road noise are worse. For longer duration bumps that the wheels follow, greater unsprung mass causes more energy to be absorbed by the wheels and makes the ride worse.

Pneumatic or elastic tires help by restoring some spring to the (otherwise) unsprung mass, but the damping possible from tire flexibility is limited by considerations of fuel economy and overheating. The shock absorbers, if any, also damp the spring motion and must be less stiff than would optimally damp the wheel bounce. So the wheels still vibrate after each bump before coming to rest. On dirt roads and on some softly paved roads, the induced motion generates small bumps, known as corrugations, washboarding or "corduroy" because they resemble smaller versions of the bumps in roads made of logs. These cause sustained wheel bounce in subsequent axles, enlarging the bumps.

High unsprung mass also exacerbates wheel control issues under hard acceleration or braking. If the vehicle does not have adequate wheel location in the vertical plane (such as a rear-wheel drive car with Hotchkiss drive, a live axle supported by simple leaf springs), vertical forces exerted by acceleration or hard braking combined with high unsprung mass can lead to severe wheel hop, compromising traction and steering control.

A beneficial effect of unsprung mass is that high frequency road irregularities, such as the gravel in an asphalt or concrete road surface, are isolated from the body more completely because the tires and springs act as separate filter stages, with the unsprung mass tending to uncouple them. Likewise, sound and vibration isolation is improved (at the expense of handling), in production automobiles, by the use of rubber bushings between the frame and suspension, by any flexibility in the frame or body work, and by the flexibility of the seats.

== Unsprung mass and vehicle design ==
Unsprung mass is a consideration in the design of a vehicle's suspension and the materials chosen for its components. Beam axle suspensions, in which wheels on opposite sides are connected as a rigid unit, generally have greater unsprung mass than independent suspension systems, in which the wheels are suspended and allowed to move separately. Heavy components such as the differential can be made part of the sprung mass by connecting them directly to the body (as in a de Dion tube rear suspension). Lightweight materials, such as aluminium, plastic, carbon fiber, and/or hollow components can provide further weight reductions at the expense of greater cost and/or fragility.

The term "unsprung mass" was coined by the mathematician Albert Healey of the Dunlop tyre company. He presented one of the first lectures taking a rigid analytical approach to suspension design, "The Tyre as a part of the Suspension System", to the Institution of Automobile Engineers in November 1924. This lecture was published as a 100-page paper.

Inboard brakes can significantly reduce unsprung mass, but put more load on half axles and (constant velocity) universal joints, and require space that may not be easily accommodated. If located next to a differential or transaxle, waste heat from the brakes may overheat the differential or vice versa, particularly in hard use, such as racing. They also make anti-dive suspension characteristics harder to achieve because the moment created by braking does not act on the suspension arms.

The Chapman strut used the driveshafts as suspension arms, thus requiring only the weight of one component rather than two. Jaguar independent rear suspension (IRS) similarly reduced unsprung mass by replacing the upper wishbone arms of the suspension with the drive shafts, as well as mounting the brakes inboard in some versions.

Scooter-type motorcycles use an integrated engine-gearbox-final drive system that pivots as part of the rear suspension and hence is partly unsprung. This arrangement is linked to the use of quite small wheels, further affecting their poor reputation for road-holding.

== See also ==
- Sprung mass
