= Oltena =

Romanian car manufacturer

Automobile Craiova S.A.
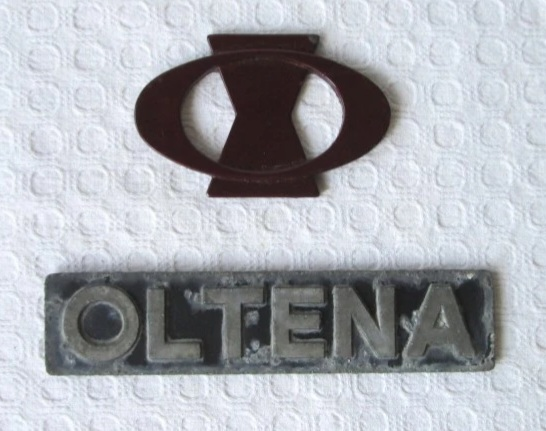
- Company type: Joint-stock company
- Industry: Automotive industry
- Predecessor: Oltcit
- Founded: 1991
- Defunct: 2006
- Fate: Acquired
- Successor: Rodae
- Headquarters: Craiova, Romania
- Products: Automobiles
- Owner: Romanian state

Oltena (officially S.C. Automobile Craiova S.A.) was a Romanian car manufacturer formed in 1991 after the takeover of the Oltcit shares held by Citroën by the Romanian state. From 1994 and up until 2006, Automobile Craiova S.A. (ACSA) had as its basic activity the sale of various spare parts and accessories for Oltena, Dacia and Daewoo cars.

== History ==
=== The beginnings ===
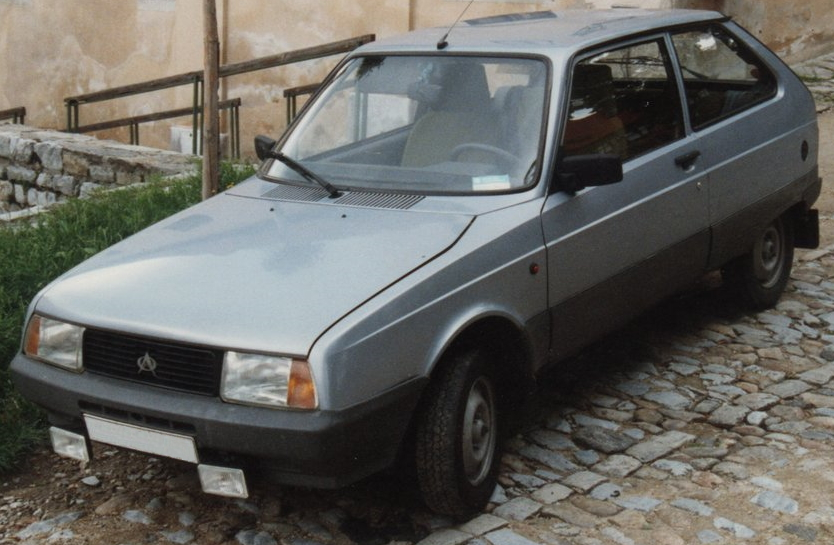
Oltcit Club (1981–1995)

The factory was founded in 1976 as the Oltcit joint venture company between the Romanian government (64%) and Citroën (36%). The factory produced cars under the Oltcit and Citroën brands for the domestic and external markets. Their main product was the Oltcit Club / Citroën Axel hatchback.

The name "Oltcit" comes from the region of Oltenia in Romania, with "cit" being an abbreviation of Citroën. The Oltcit logo is also similar to the Citroën one, but features only one chevron, as opposed to the two found on Citroën's logo, plus the letter "O".

=== The 1990s ===
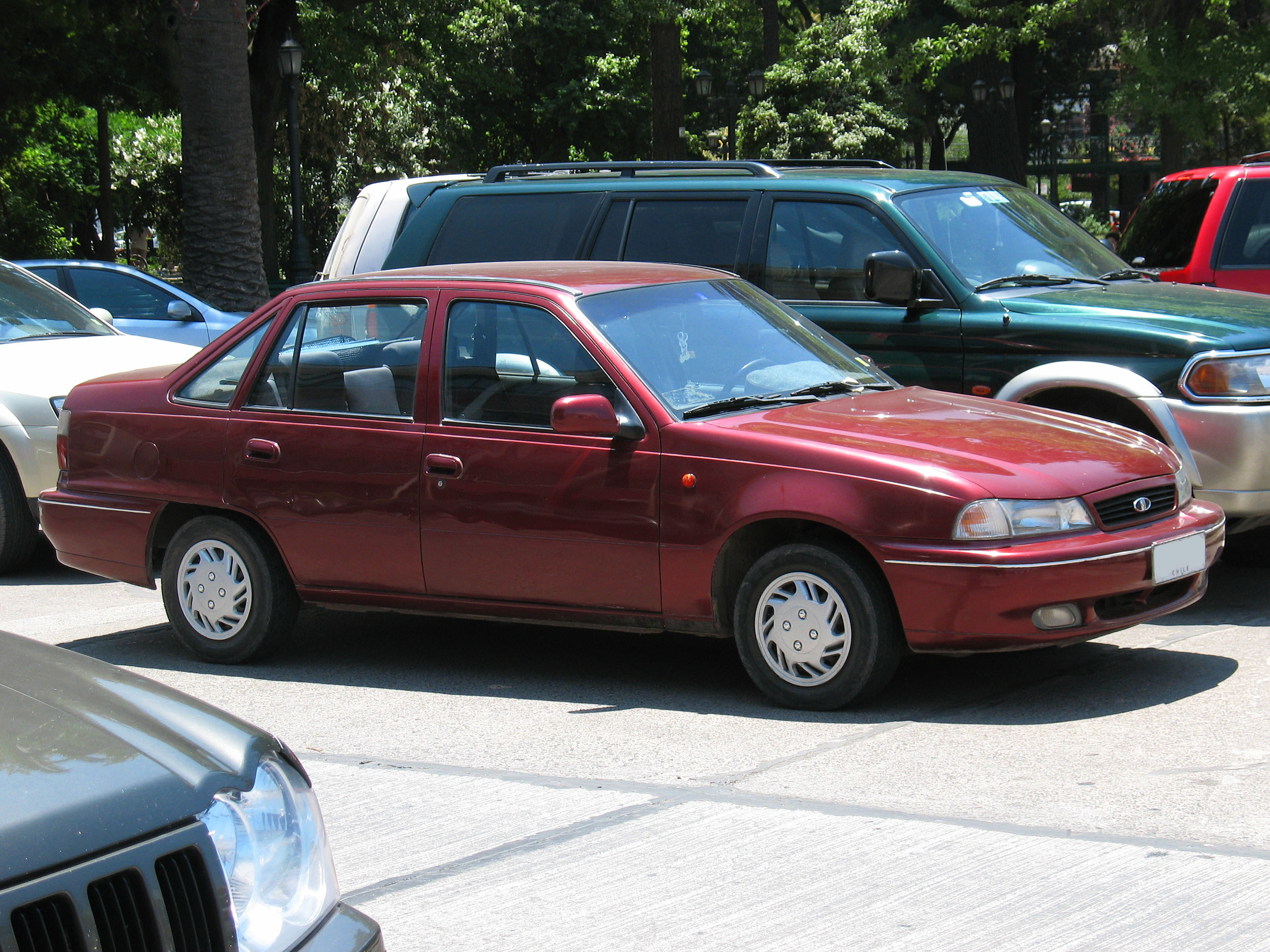
Daewoo Cielo (1996–2007)

In 1991, as a result of the withdrawal of Citroën from the joint venture, the name of the company was changed to Automobile Craiova and production continued under the Oltena brand.

In 1994, the company decided to go into partnership (49%-51%) with Korean company Daewoo Heavy Industries (later Daewoo Motors) as Rodae Automobile. After producing the Oltcit between 1981–1996 (starting 1992 rebadged as Oltena, and as Rodae after 1994), the company started producing the Tico, Cielo and Espero.

In 1997, the name was changed to Daewoo Automobile Romania and a new engine and transmission factory was opened by the company, and by 2001 was also producing the Matiz and Nubira II. However, by this time, the main parent company in Korea had collapsed, due to financial problems in South Korea economy and over-expansion in Central Asia and Eastern Europe.

In 2002, General Motors bought the bulk of Daewoo Motor in South Korea, but did not buy the plants producing Daewoo cars in Romania, Poland, Ukraine or Uzbekistan. Due to this deal, the Romanian company was not allowed to export their products to neighbouring countries any more, or produce newer models by the new GM Daewoo company.

To make matters worse for the company, General Motors started selling the products of the GM Daewoo in 2003, under the Chevrolet brand.

=== Acquisition by Ford ===
The first Ford Transit Connect built in Craiova at the presentation event on 8 September 2009

In 2006, the Romanian government bought out Daewoo's 51% in the joint venture for US$ 60 million. A year later, in September 2007, Ford Motor Company was interested to acquire a 72.4 percent stake in the company for 57 million euro and on 21 March 2008 the acquisition contract was signed and Ford officially took over Automobile Craiova (later transferring the fixed assets to Ford Romania). As of May 2009, Ford acquired a majority 95.63% stake in the company.

Ford Transit Connect, both the passenger carrying and van models, was Ford's first model produced in Craiova, followed by low-displacement car engines and a small wagon, the new Ford B-Max. The plant will add a second, as-yet-unnamed small-segment model.

In March 2016, it was announced that the Ford EcoSport will be built in Romania, at Craiova plant starting from the autumn of 2017, moving production for the European market from the current plant in Chennai, India. This happens on the background of the growing market for the SUV segment in Europe, and will bring an investment of €200 million to the factory.

== Models ==
- Oltena Club (1991–1994)
- Oltena Club 12 CS (1993–1994)
