= Daewoo Tico =

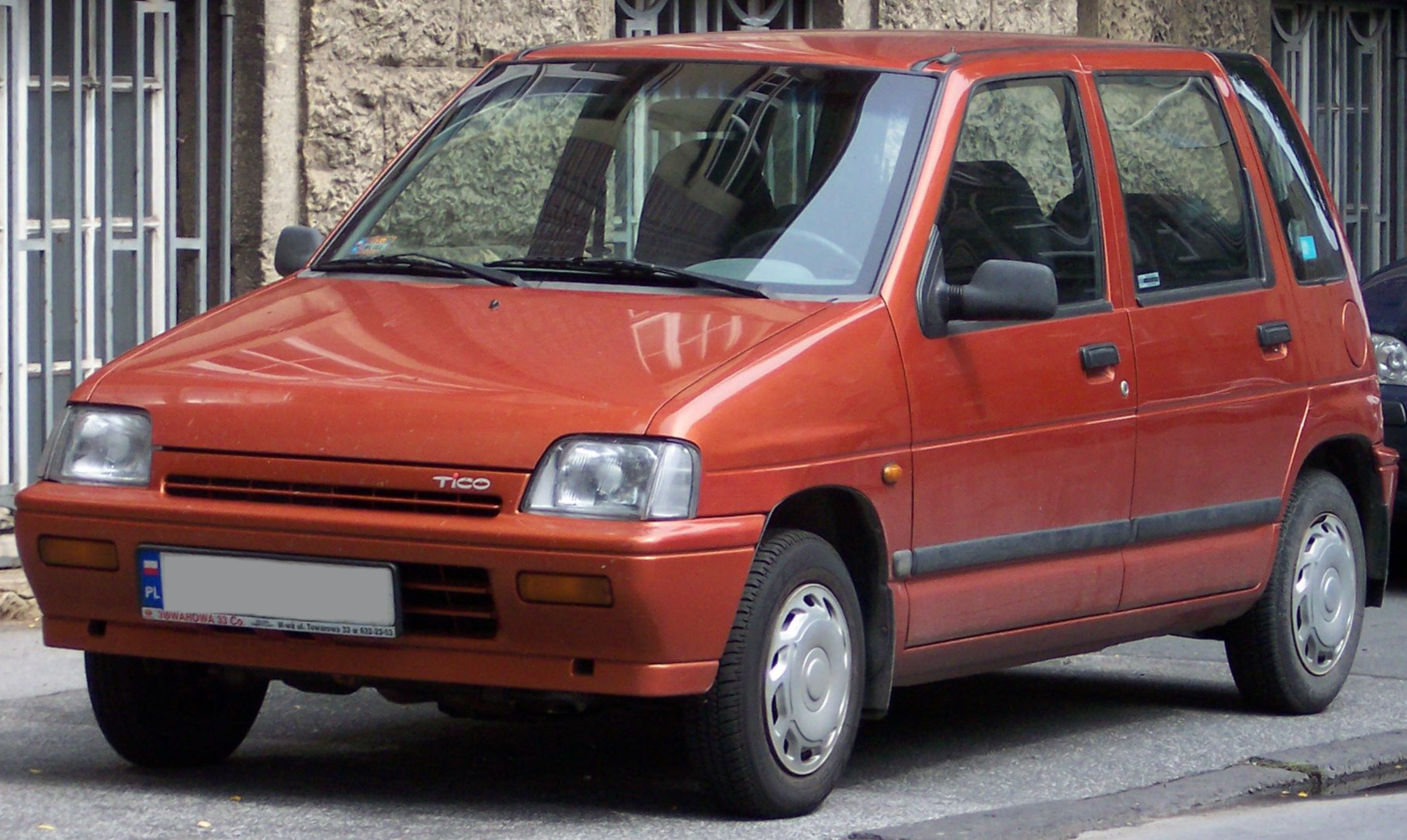

Overview
- Manufacturer: Daewoo
- Also called: Daewoo Fino (Latin America)
- Production: May 1991 – September 2000 (South Korea); 1996–2001 (Poland, Uzbekistan); 1998–2002 (Romania)
- Model years: 1991–2002
- Assembly: South Korea: Changwon; Poland: Warsaw (FSO); Romania: Craiova (Rodae); Uzbekistan: Asaka (UzDaewoo)

Body and chassis
- Class: City car
- Body style: 5-door hatchback
- Layout: Front-engine, front-wheel-drive
- Related: Suzuki Alto III

Powertrain
- Engine: 0.8 L S-TEC I3 (petrol)
- Transmission: 5-speed manual 3-speed automatic

Dimensions
- Wheelbase: 2,334 mm (91.9 in)
- Length: 3,340 mm (131.5 in)
- Width: 1,400 mm (55.1 in)
- Height: 1,394 mm (54.9 in)
- Kerb weight: 680 kg (1,499 lb)

Chronology
- Successor: Daewoo Matiz

The Daewoo Tico is a city car produced by the South Korean automaker Daewoo from 1991 to 2002.

== Overview ==
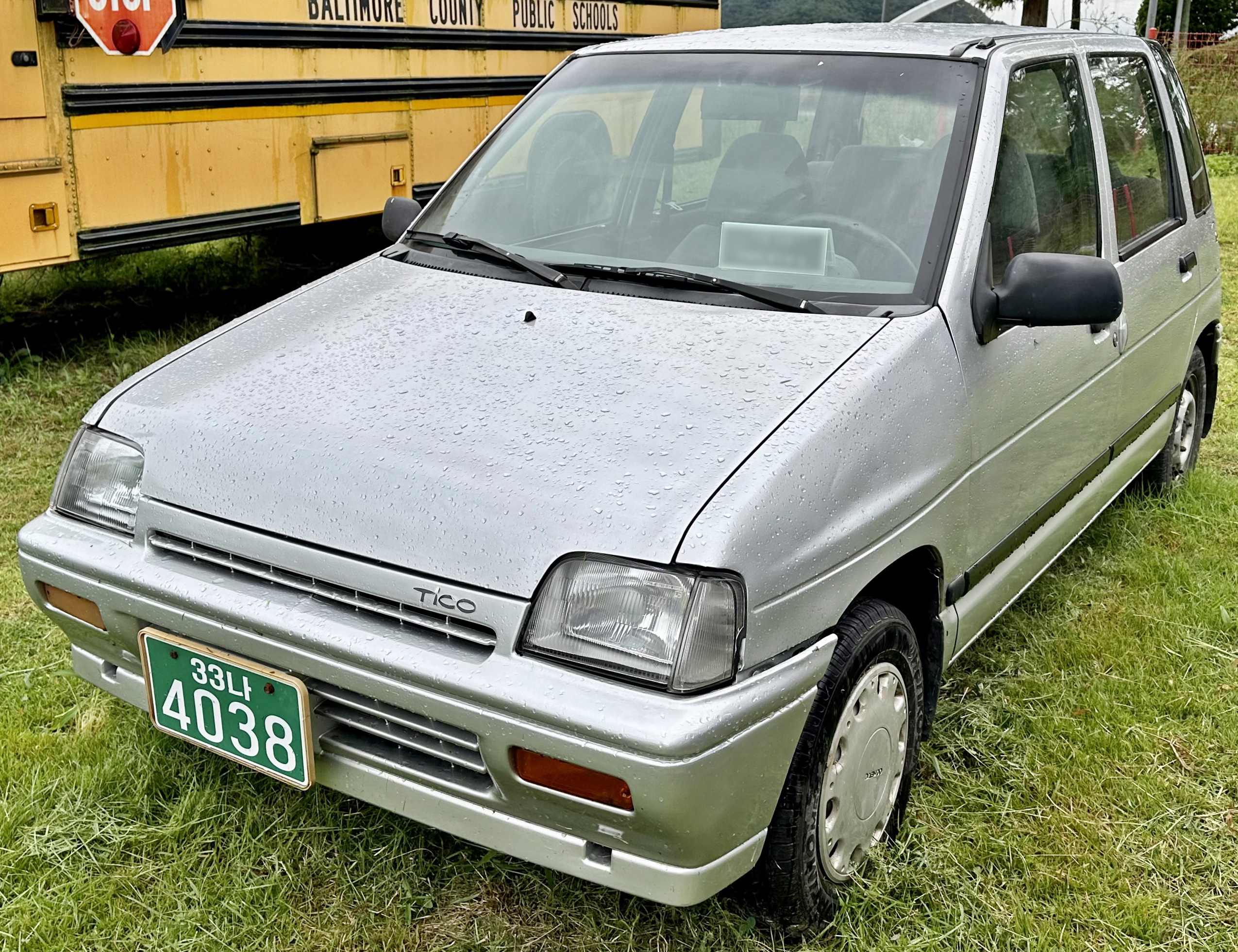
Daewoo Tico (South Korea)

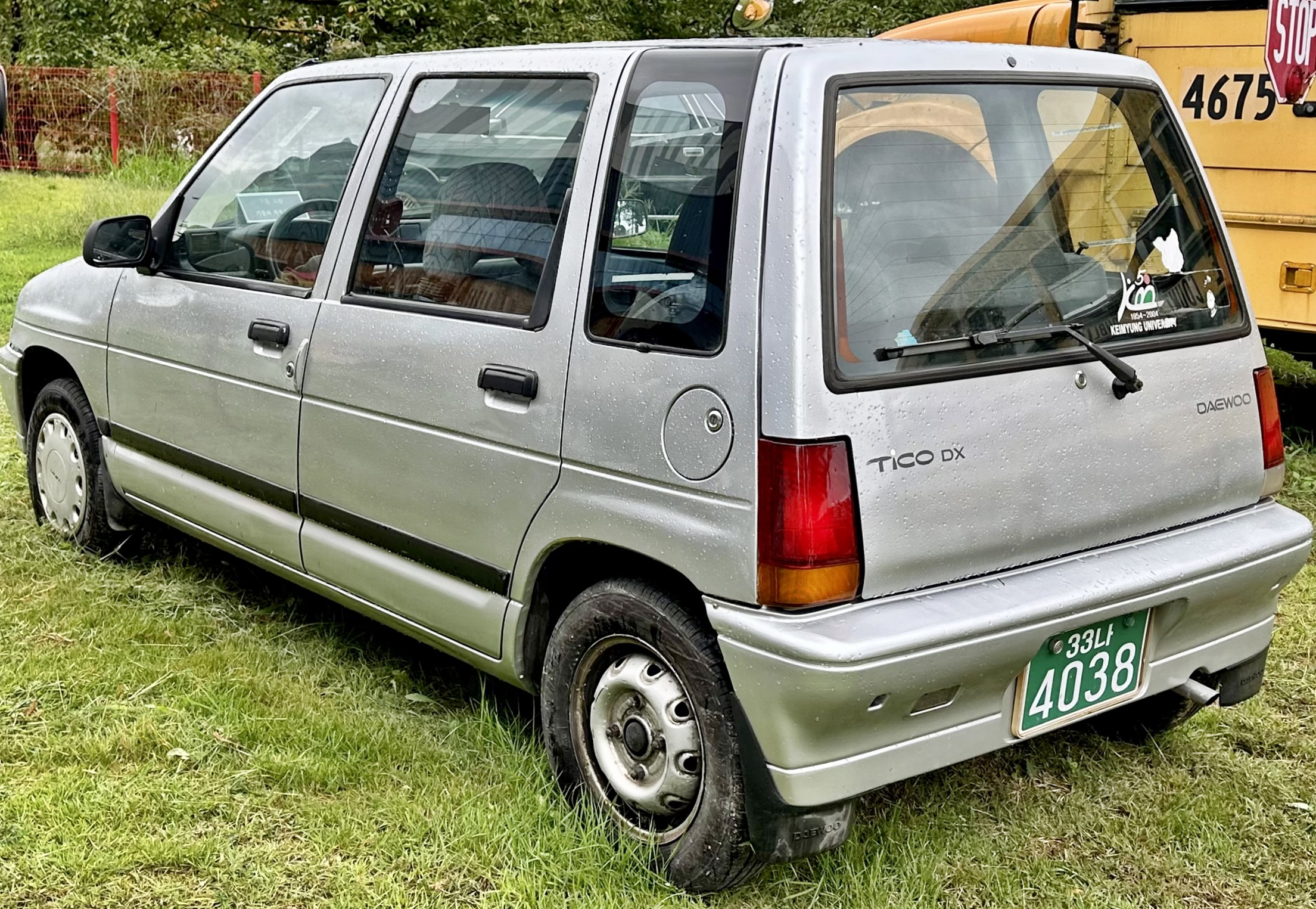
Daewoo Tico (South Korea) rear view

The Daewoo Tico was based largely on the 1988 Suzuki Alto kei car. The car was equipped with a three-cylinder 796 cc S-TEC engine - a South Korean-made version of the Suzuki F8B engine - and came with either a five-speed manual transmission or three-speed automatic transmission (only in South Korea). The Tico was exported to European markets and was highly popular mainly in Eastern Europe. It was also exported to Latin America where it was named Daewoo Fino for some markets. It was especially popular in Peru, where it was one of the most popular car models used for taxi services.

Daewoo expanded to Western Europe at the beginning of 1995, but the Tico was never sold in those markets. Its successor, the Matiz, was launched globally in 1998 and went on to be a sales success.

Over its years of production, the Tico underwent major modifications to its specifications, mostly to the engine. Originally equipped with a carburetor and producing 48 hp (35 kW), it was later upgraded to fuel injection, thus passing the Euro 2 pollution standard, whilst also giving an increase in power output. Some versions of the Tico in the Korean domestic market were powered by liquefied petroleum gas.

Daewoo produced the Tico at the old Oltcit factory in Romania.

In 1998, the Tico was replaced with a new car, the Daewoo Matiz. The Tico was sold alongside the Matiz until 2001.
