= Valve oil =

Lubricant for brass instrument valves

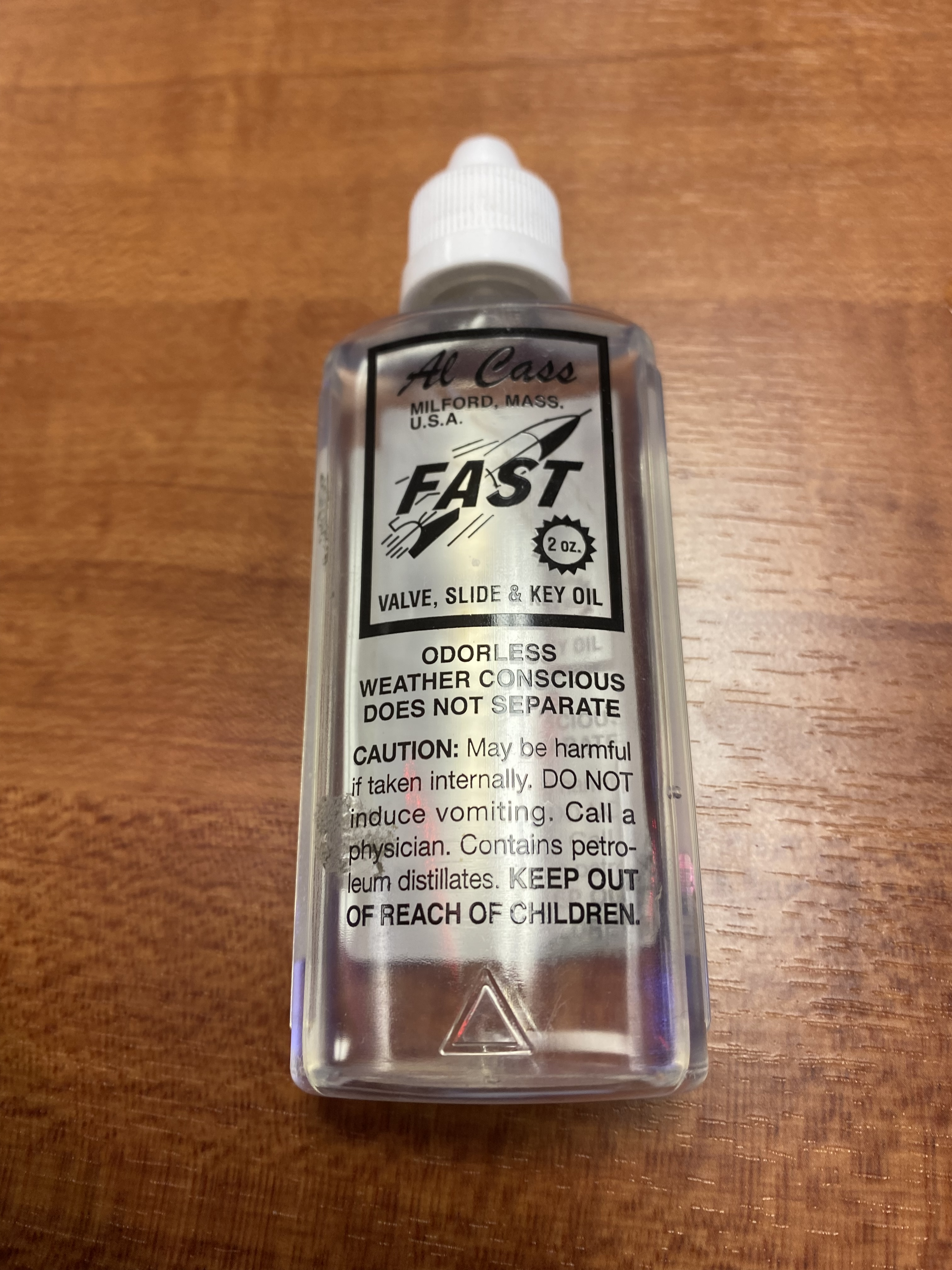
Al Cass valve oil

Valve oil is a lubricant for valves of brass instruments. It is typically mostly mineral oil with a small amount of other ingredients, although synthetic oils are increasingly available.

== Uses ==
Besides lubricating the moving parts of the valve, valve oil provides corrosion protection to the bare metal of the inner valve. While the valve piston or rotor is made of a metal which is more resistant to corrosion, the inner valve casing is typically bare brass. (The brass on the outside of a modern instrument is lacquered or plated to prevent corrosion.) The oil also completes the seal between the valve casing and the piston or rotor.

Although a clean and unoiled valve of a well maintained instrument should move without unusual force, the inside of a musical instrument is a very inhospitable environment for a delicate valve mechanism. The musician constantly blows warm moist air through the valve. Worse, impurities may be blown from the musician's mouth into the instrument. Even if nothing grows in the valve, the condensation and changing temperature of the metal can cause an untreated valve to bind, possibly resulting in a stuck valve. Even a minor binding of a valve affects the play-ability of the instrument and is at least very annoying. Also, woodwind musicians use valve oil (called key oil for woodwinds since they do not have valves, they have keys) to lubricate the mechanism of the keys to improve the springback action. However, woodwinds usually oil their keys only every few months, whereas some brass players lubricate their valves several times a week.

== Types ==
There are two main valve types on brass instruments: piston and rotor. Accordingly, vendors sell different types of oil, including scented varieties. Some vendors recommend up to three different types of oil for some valve types. Slide oil for trombones is also a very similar solution. The difference between oil types is primarily the viscosity. The minerals in the valve oil are dangerous and can cause serious health problems if swallowed.

Synthetic valve oils have become more readily available. Their characteristics include, but are not necessarily limited to, greater compatibility with other related oils without chemical reactions (some types of mineral based oils or their additives were known to react with each other, forming thick solids - this required disassembly and complete cleaning of the valves to restore operation), slow evaporation or total lack of evaporation resulting in fewer oilings required, and less dissipation on contact with moisture inside the valve. Some synthetics have the additional advantage that they do not act as thinners for mineral-based slide greases (previously, mineral-based valve oil inserted into a valve by way of a tuning slide could carry some slide grease with it, fouling the valve). Finally, high-viscosity synthetic oils can increase valve compression and improve feel in instruments with worn valves, returning such instruments to playable condition.
