= SS4 =

SS4 may refer to:

- SS-4 Sandal, a Soviet theatre ballistic missile
- Ambrosini SS.4, an Italian fighter aircraft prototype
- Pindad SS4, an Indonesian battle rifle in development
- SS 4, an Italian state highway, linking Rome to the Adriatic sea
- Super Select, a four-wheel drive system produced by Mitsubishi
- USS Grampus (SS-4), a submarine of the United States Navy
- Super Saiyan 4, a fictional transformation from the Dragon Ball series
