= DAC (vehicle manufacturer) =

Romanian commercial vehicle manufacturer

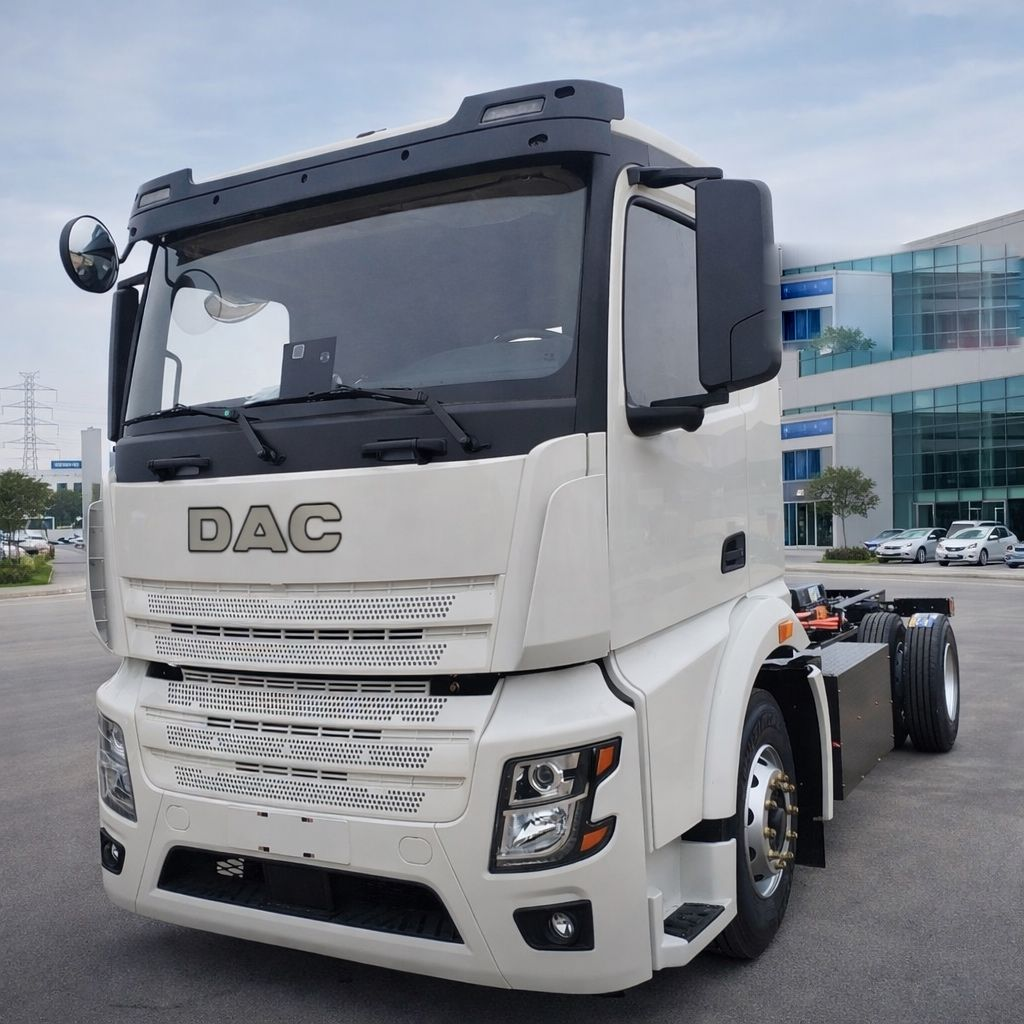
- DAC Derzis 18.360 electric truck chassis
- Type: Brand
- Industry: Automotive
- Founded: 1971; 55 years ago
- Headquarters: Brașov, Romania
- Area served: Eastern Europe, Middle East
- Products: Trucks, buses, trolleybuses, port tractors, mine dumpers
- Parent: Autovehicule DAC S.A.
- Website: www.dac.eu

DAC is a Romanian commercial vehicle brand associated with the truck works at Brașov. The initials are generally expanded as Diesel Auto Camion (also rendered Diesel Automobil Camion), and were adopted in the 1970s to distinguish diesel-engined vehicles from the earlier petrol-engined range; the name has also been linked to the Dacian heritage of the region.

From the 1970s to the 1990s the marque was applied to trucks, buses, trolleybuses and specialised vehicles for civilian, industrial, mining and military use, built alongside the Roman range on shared platforms. After the privatisation of Roman S.A. in 2004, production was consolidated under the Roman brand and DAC fell out of use. The brand was relaunched in 2025 by Autovehicule DAC S.A. as a producer of electric commercial vehicles.

== History ==
=== Origins ===
The Brașov Truck Factory (Întreprinderea Autocamioane Brașov) was established after World War II on the foundation of the ROMLOC automotive factory built in 1921. Under communist administration the plant was named Steagul Roșu ("The Red Flag"). By 2000, approximately 750,000 trucks had been produced at the site.

=== MAN licence and the DAC name ===
In 1971 the Romanian government concluded a licensing agreement with the West German manufacturer MAN, under which the Brașov plant began producing trucks branded Roman. From 1973, as MAN inline six-cylinder diesel engines replaced the earlier V8 petrol units, vehicles fitted with the new engines were designated DAC. Early models used a 5,489 cc MAN engine rated at 135 hp, together with a strengthened frame and revised suspension that raised payload capacity from five to six tonnes.

DAC vehicles shared construction platforms with the Roman range, and in the post-1990 period identical trucks were offered under either badge according to customer preference.

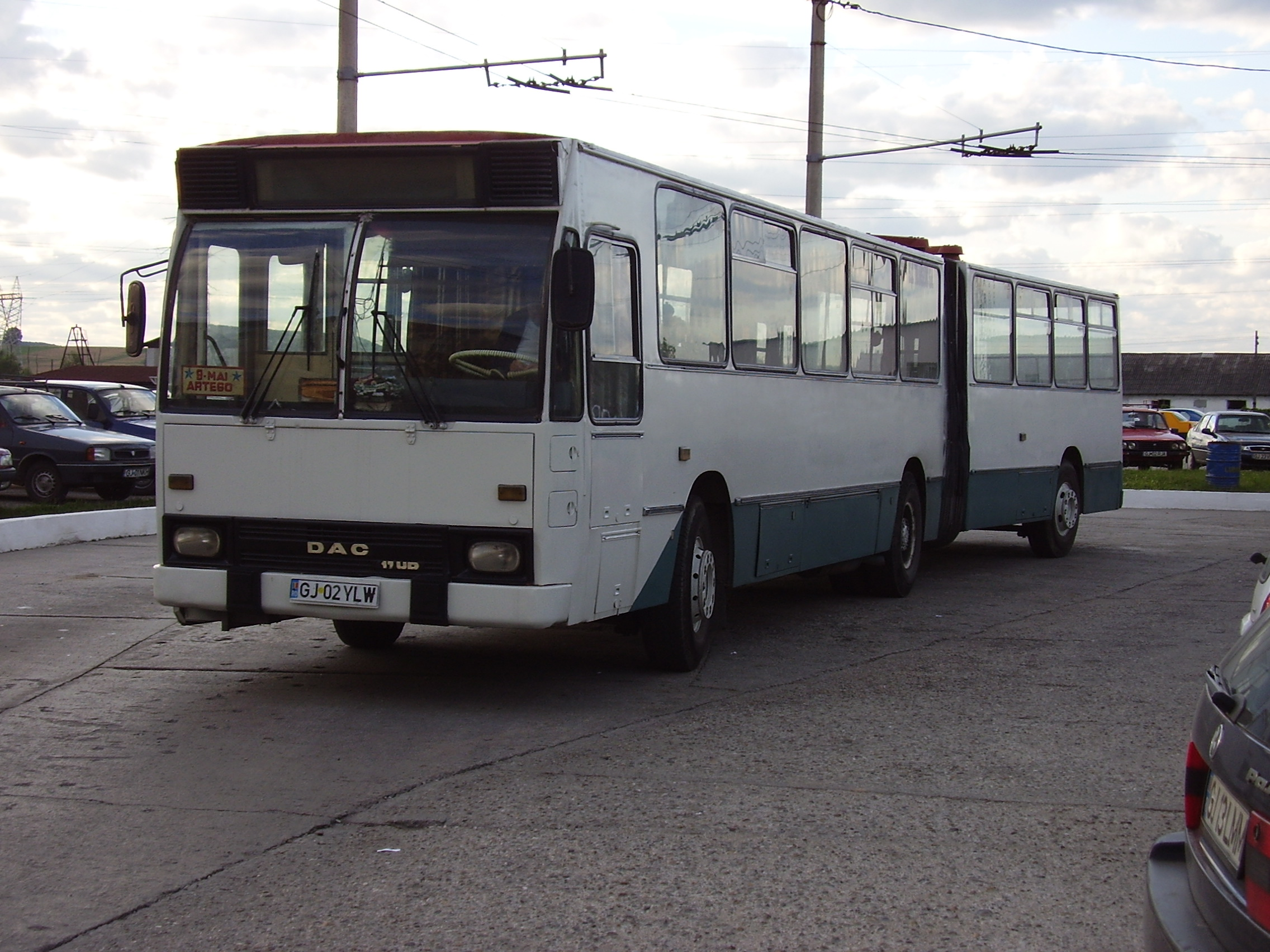
DAC 117UD articulated bus in Tg. Jiu

=== In-house engine development ===
In the early 1980s the company developed its own diesel engines with outputs of 240, 280 and 320 hp. These were marked with the additional letter "R" for Romanian, denoting a step beyond the original licence agreement, and were fitted to models ranging from 16.240 to 32.280. Engineering consultancy for the programme was provided by the Austrian institute AVL List; a 12.4-litre V8 unit designated 1240-V8-DT and rated at 320 hp was fitted to the heaviest models.

Vehicles were equipped with standardised cabs of in-house production, available in Normal, Medium and Double Size versions. The plant also manufactured front axles, drive axles, frames, wheels and bodies.

=== 1981 - 2004 ===
In 1984, following the expiration of the licensing agreement with MAN, a broader part of the Roman range was rebranded as DAC. In 1990 the Brașov plant was restructured by government decision into the joint-stock company Roman S.A. The loss of access to major export markets followed, and the plant began fitting older chassis with imported components, primarily diesel engines complying with newer emissions standards. Production of DAC trucks continued for until 2004. S.C. Roman S.A. Brașov was privatised in 2004, after which the new ownership consolidated production under the Roman brand nad the DAC brand was used only for military vehicles.

== CN Series ==
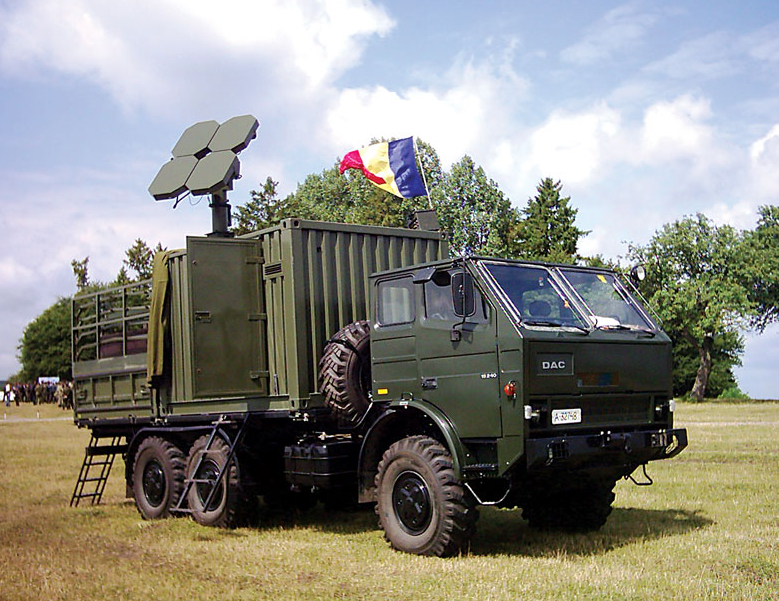
DAC 15.240 DFAEG

The CN series was an in-house development of Autocamioane Brașov, available from 1977. It was offered with 4×4, 6×6 and 8×8 wheel configurations and 3 to 10 tonne cargo capacity. The series featured a rectangular all-metal cab with horizontally grooved doors and side panels, a flat front end and a sloping hinged windshield. Vehicles were equipped with licence-built MAN D2156 six-cylinder diesel engines and a five- or six-speed transmission, two-speed transfer case, wheel planetary gear drives, lockable differentials, dual air brakes, power steering and 24-volt electrical equipment.

In addition to the DAC 665T (6×6), the factory produced a shortened version, the DAC 444T (4×4), with an off-road payload capacity of 2.5 tonnes.

== Military vehicles ==
DAC produced a range of high-mobility military trucks that entered service with the Romanian Armed Forces and were exported.

Model	Introduced	Drive	Payload	Engine
DAC 444T		4×4	2.5 t	MAN D2156
DAC 665T	1977	6×6	5 t	MAN D2156, 10.3 L, 215 hp
DAC 667T		6×6	7 t	MAN D2156, 10.3 L, 215 hp
DAC 6610T		6×6	10 t	MAN D2156, 10.3 L, 215 hp
DAC 887R		8×8	7 t	1240-V8-DT, 12.4 L, 320 hp

Design features included mechanically lockable differentials on all axles and electromechanically controlled inter-axle differentials, uncommon in vehicles of the period and class. Reported top speed for the six-wheel-drive models was 85 km/h, with a towed load capacity of ten tonnes.

Military and special-purpose DAC vehicles were exported to Iran, Iraq, Syria, Peru and Cuba, and after 1989 to the United States, Liberia, Nigeria, Croatia, Bosnia and Herzegovina and Cameroon. The chassis also saw limited civilian use in construction applications.

== DAC 665 ==
The 665 series is among the longest-serving vehicles produced under the DAC brand, remaining in use with the Romanian, Georgian and Croatian armed forces.

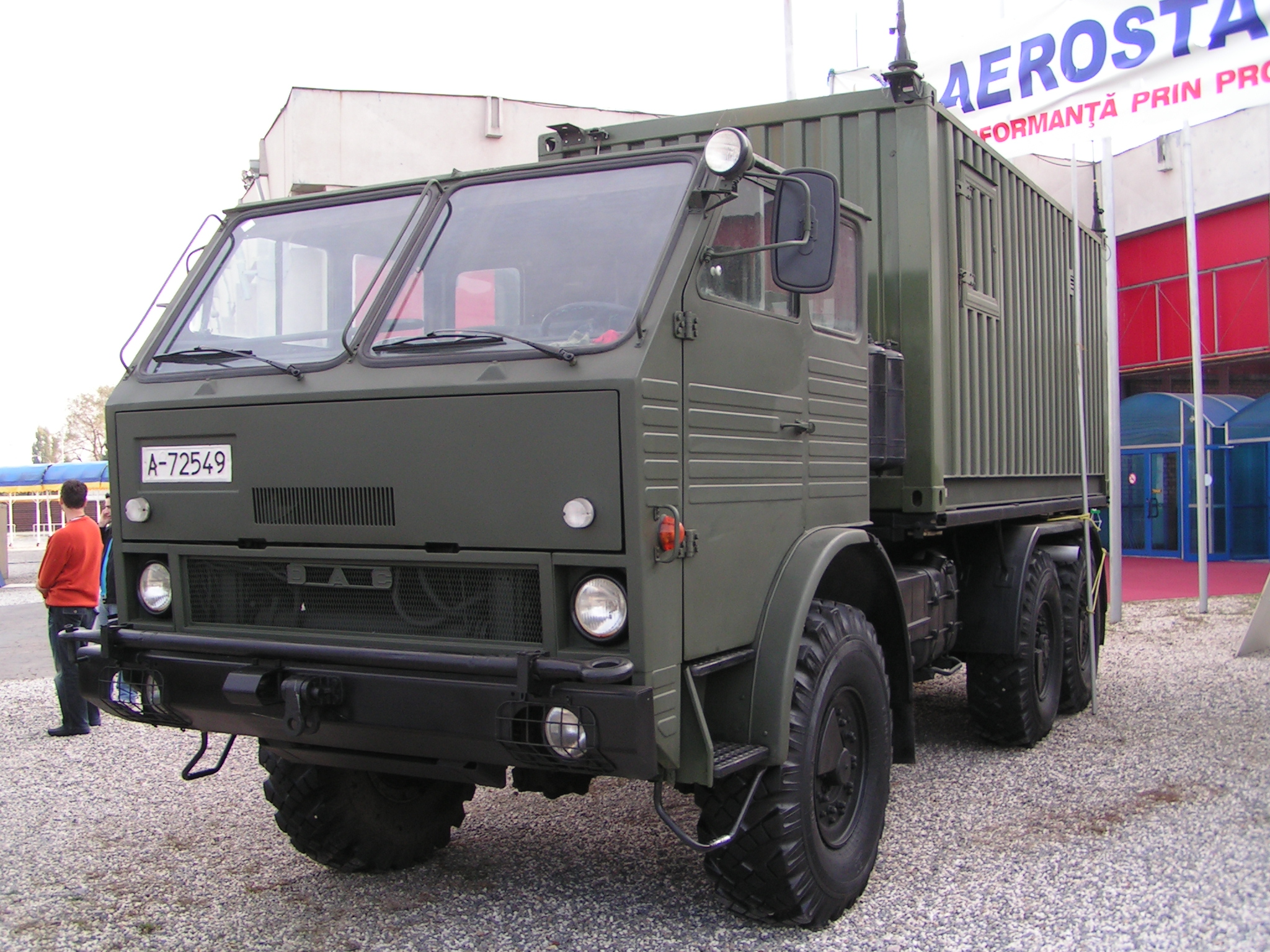
DAC 665T - LAROM command center

The DAC 665 is a family of military trucks designed for traction and transport, manufactured by the Autocamioane Brașov plant in the 1980s. It was produced in multiple versions and exported to Hungary, Egypt, Iraq and Cuba.

In the Romanian Army the DAC 665T has been used as a transport vehicle, an artillery tractor and a chassis for specialised superstructures. Built with three axles, two of them rear axles, the vehicle had full all-wheel drive and was nicknamed "the little tank". It was equipped with an AK 6-80 gearbox with reducer.

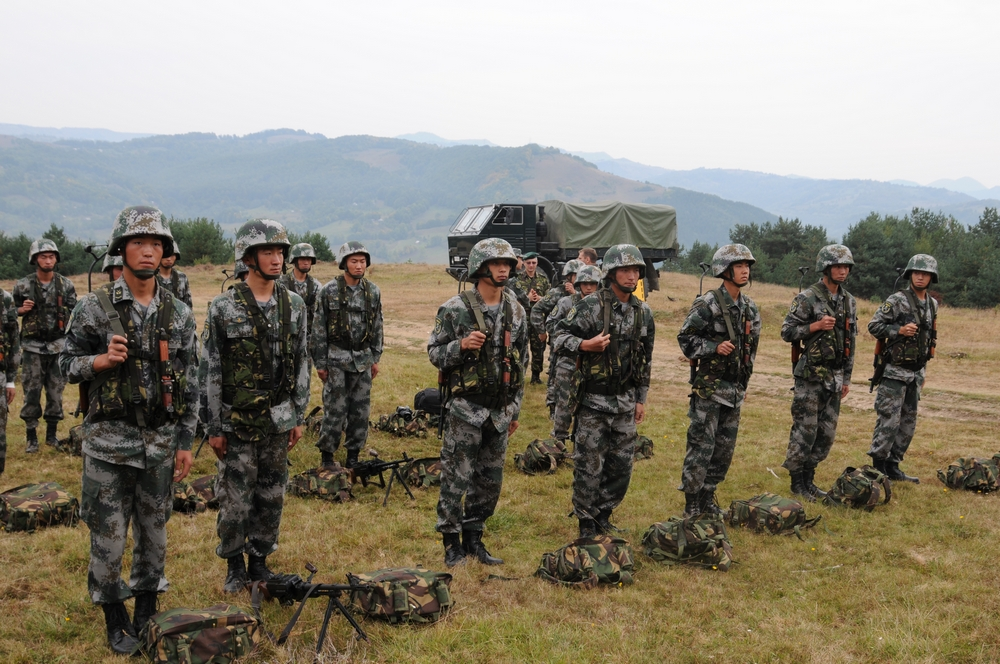
DAC 665T in the background of Sino-Romanian joint training Friendship Action 2009

The DAC 665G variant was used to transport pontoons from the bridge parks of the Romanian Army. Both versions featured full 6×6 all-wheel drive, and the chassis served as the foundation for several specialised vehicles.

== DAC 120 DE (1988–1990) ==
The DAC 120 DE was a high-capacity mining truck designed by the ICPAT Institute in Brașov and produced between 1988 and 1990. It used diesel-electric propulsion: a 65-litre diesel engine powered two electric motors mounted on the rear axle, each rated at 520 hp.

Specifications:

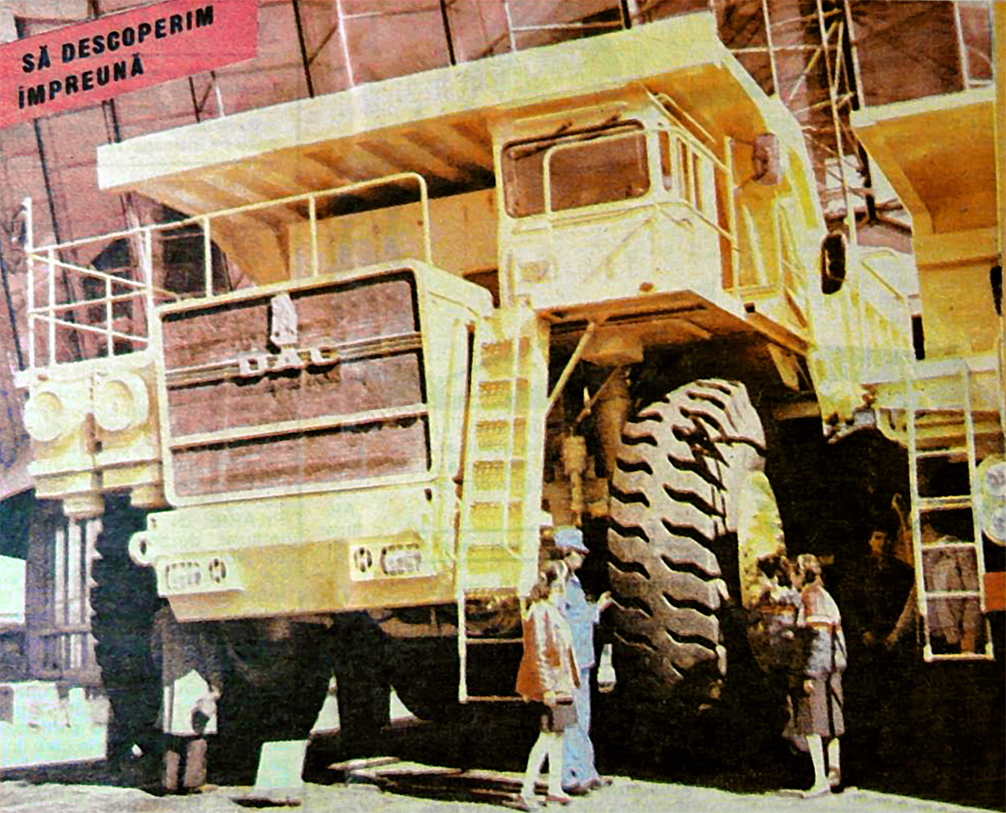
DAC 120DE mining truck

- Weight: 90 t
- Load capacity: 120 t
- Dimensions: 10 m long, 5.4 m high
- Wheel diameter: 3.2 m
- Maximum speed: 55 km/h loaded, 70 km/h empty
- Range: up to one week of work (2 × 1,600 L tanks)

Approximately 20 units were produced. Five were exported to Australia; the remainder were used in Romania at Roșia Poieni and Mahmudia, and in the construction of the Danube–Black Sea Canal.

== Buses and trolleybuses ==
Alongside trucks, the Brașov works supplied chassis for buses and trolleybuses, several of which carried DAC badging with bodies built by Rocar and by the Bulgarian manufacturer Chavdar, under DAC-Chavdar name. Models included the DAC 117UD articulated city bus and the DAC 217E and DAC-Chavdar 117 ET trolleybuses, the latter operated in Bulgaria and Ukraine.

Also 112UD, 117UD and 118UD buses was sold in West Germany under IDAC brand.

== Electric relaunch (2025–present) ==
After nearly two decades of inactivity, the DAC brand was relaunched in 2024 by Autovehicule DAC S.A., led by the entrepreneur Sergiu Bolocan, as a producer of electric vehicles. According to the company, the initials are now presented as "Drive Auto Clean", retaining the historic letters.

=== Portfolio ===
The announced initial portfolio comprises ten models in three segments:

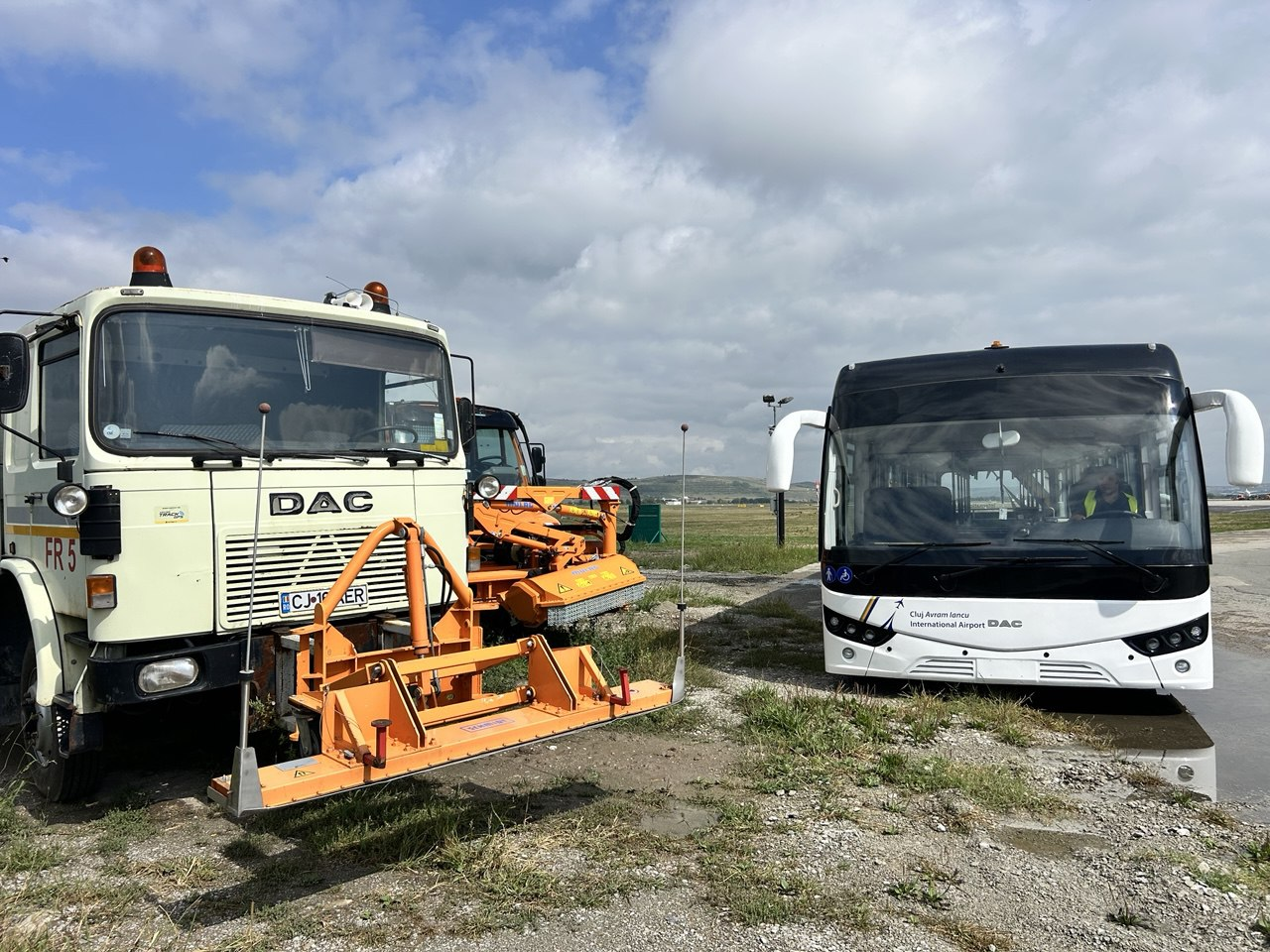
1. New DAC Aerobus 14.100 alongside DAC19.215
  Passenger transport: buses, electric minibuses and trolleybuses for urban and school transport.
2. Mining vehicles: high-capacity electric dump trucks and port tractors.
3. Urban and sanitation vehicles: 7.5-tonne and 18-tonne electric trucks.

The first vehicle presented under the revived brand was an 18-tonne electric tipper truck, announced at a price of approximately €150,000. In February 2026 the company delivered two DAC CityLINE 408.60 electric buses to the town of Vișeu de Sus under the "Coridor de mobilitate – Zona Urbană a Văii Vaserului" project. The model is 8,545 mm long, carries up to 60 passengers and uses a 193 kWh lithium iron phosphate battery, with a stated range of up to 330 km measured to the eSORT2 cycle and charging at 120 kW DC or 22 kW AC.

=== Manufacturing and technology ===
Autovehicule DAC S.A. occupies a production hall within the Roman platform in Brașov, where vehicles are assembled from CKD kits: the cab arrives assembled, while the chassis, axles, springs and power electronics are delivered separately. Electric trucks intended for urban traffic are initially assembled on a bench, with a move to an assembly line planned as volumes increase.

The vehicles use LFP batteries and asynchronous motors with air and liquid cooling. The 18-tonne urban trucks have a symmetrical rear drive axle with two independent motors, one on each wheel.

=== Stated objectives ===
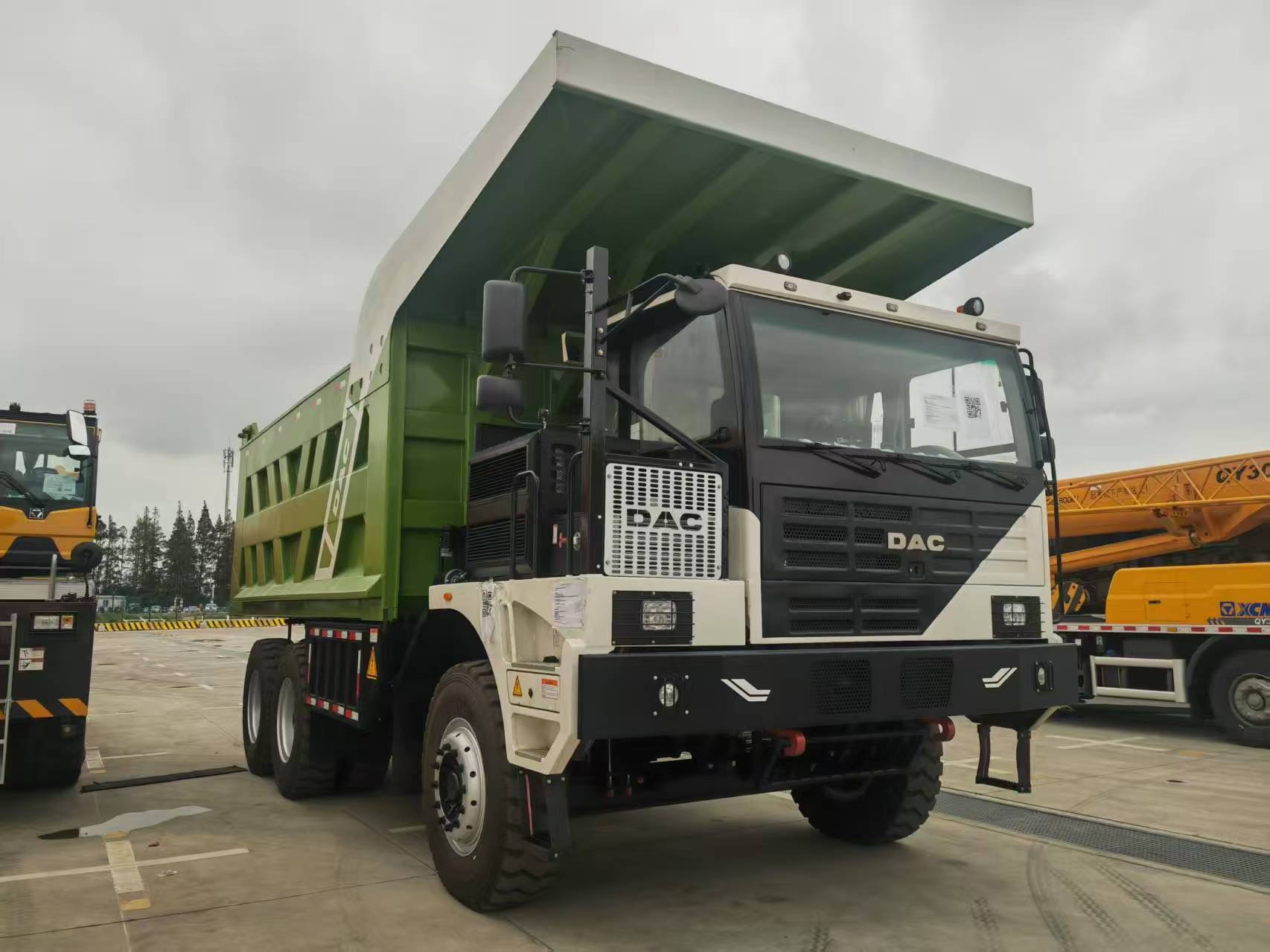
Electric mining truck DAC90TEF.OH

The company has stated a target of selling more than 30,000 electric vehicles by 2035, and has said its priority is the urban and public transport segment, alongside industrial and mining vehicles.

=== Reception ===
Coverage of the relaunch has noted that the first vehicles delivered under the revived brand closely resemble Chinese-built models and incorporate components sourced from China. The company has acknowledged this, describing plans to increase locally manufactured content at its Brașov facility.

== Models ==
- DAC 120 DE – diesel-electric 120 t mining dump truck
- DAC 6135 – light duty truck
- DAC 665 – military off-road truck

== Gallery ==
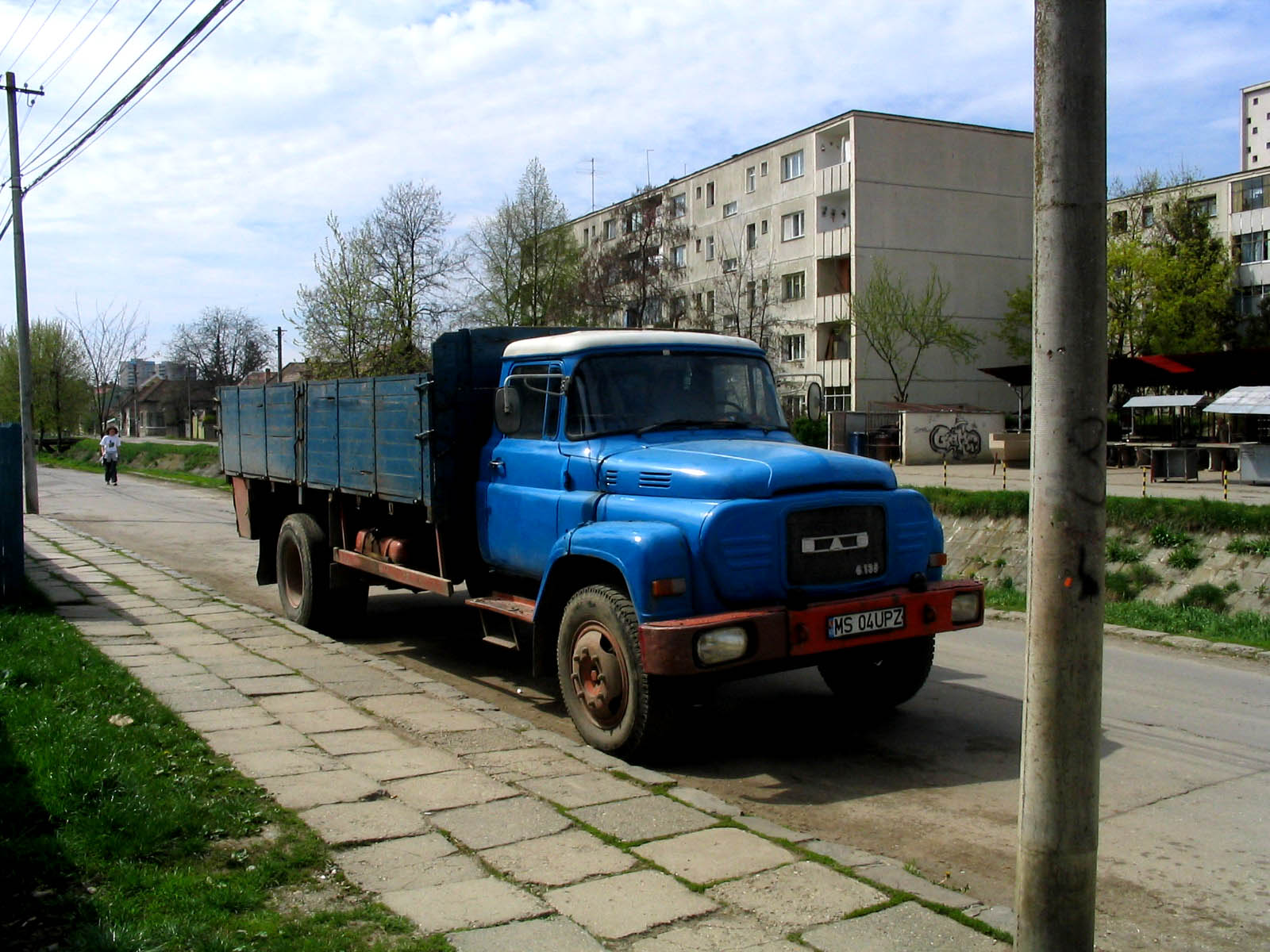
DAC 6135 (SR-DAC) based on SR-113 Bucegi

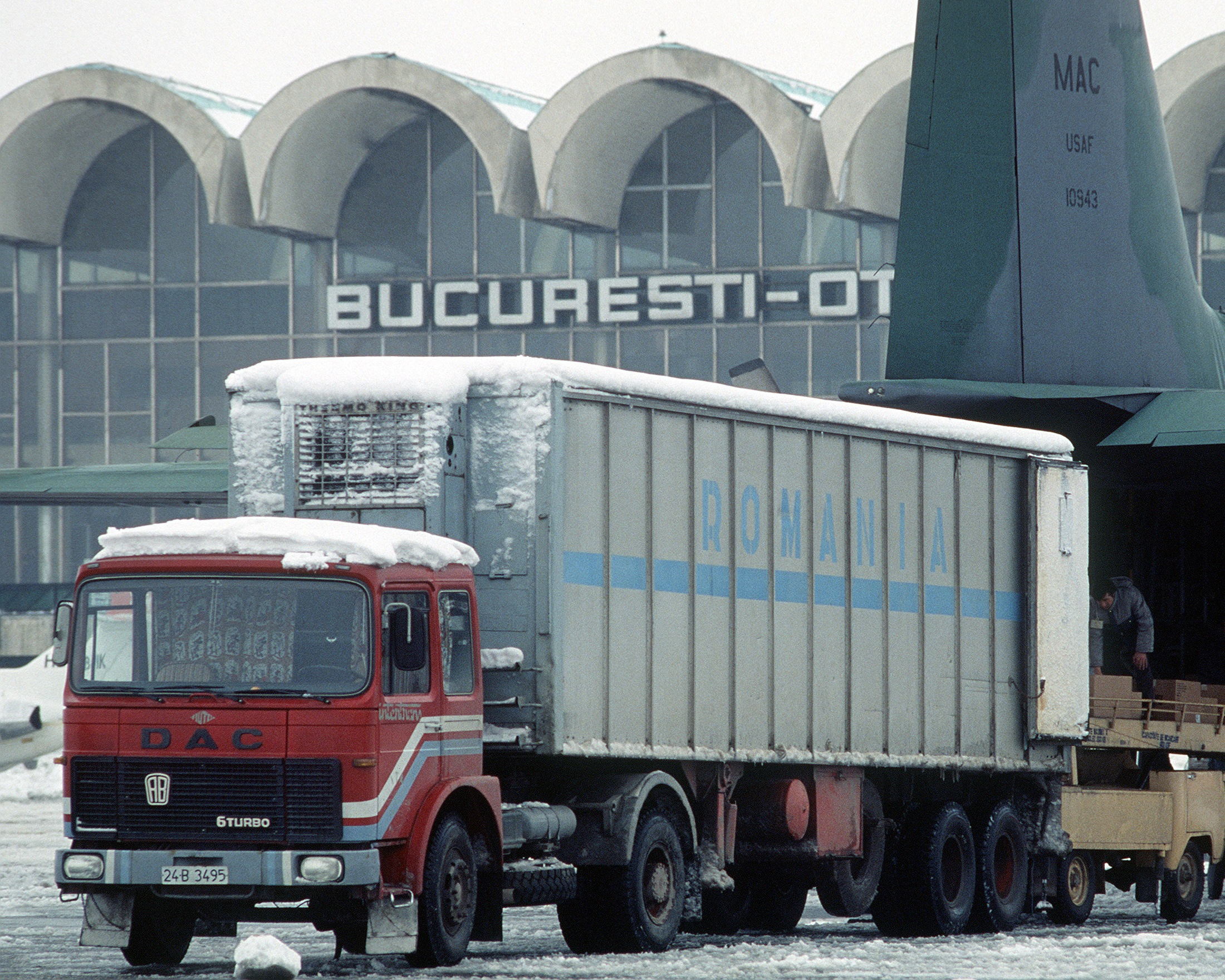
DAC 6 Turbo truck, Bucharest-Otopeni Airport, 1989

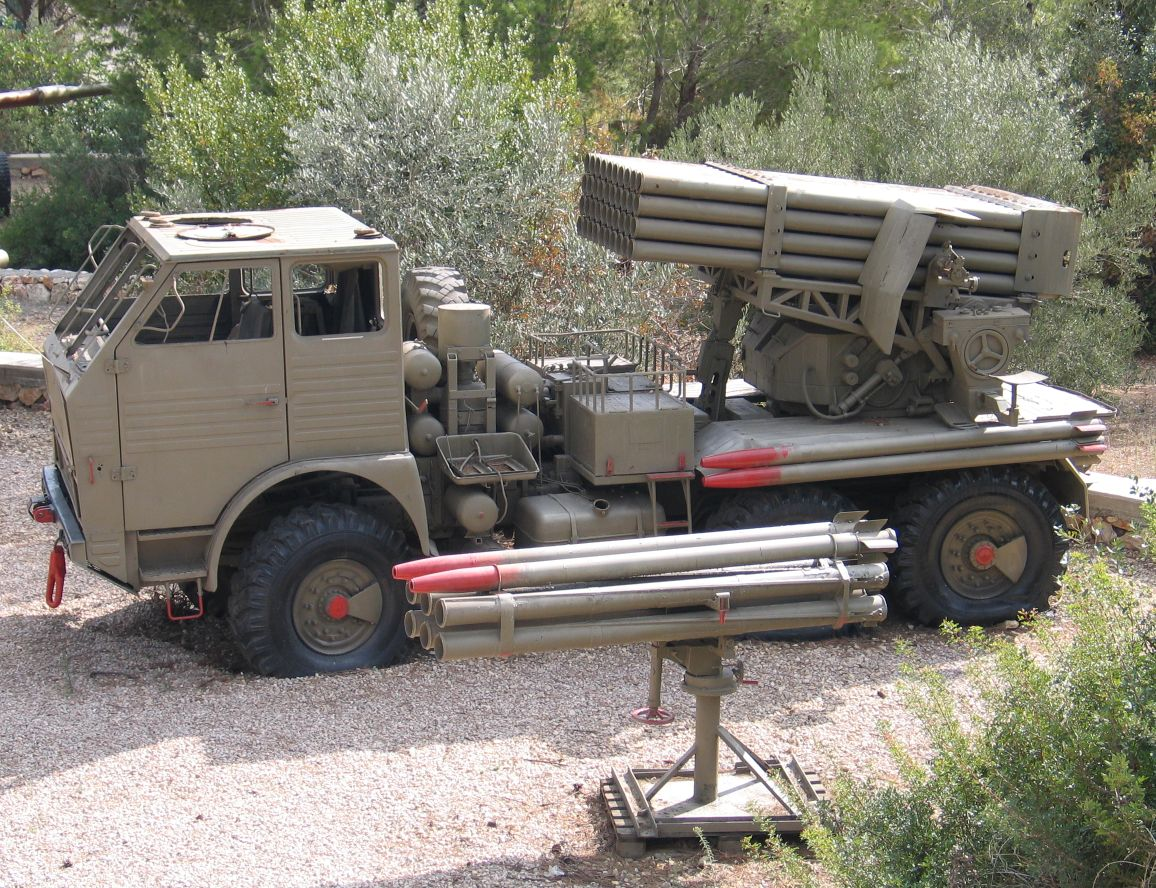
DAC 665T with APRA-40, a Romanian variant of the BM-21 Grad.

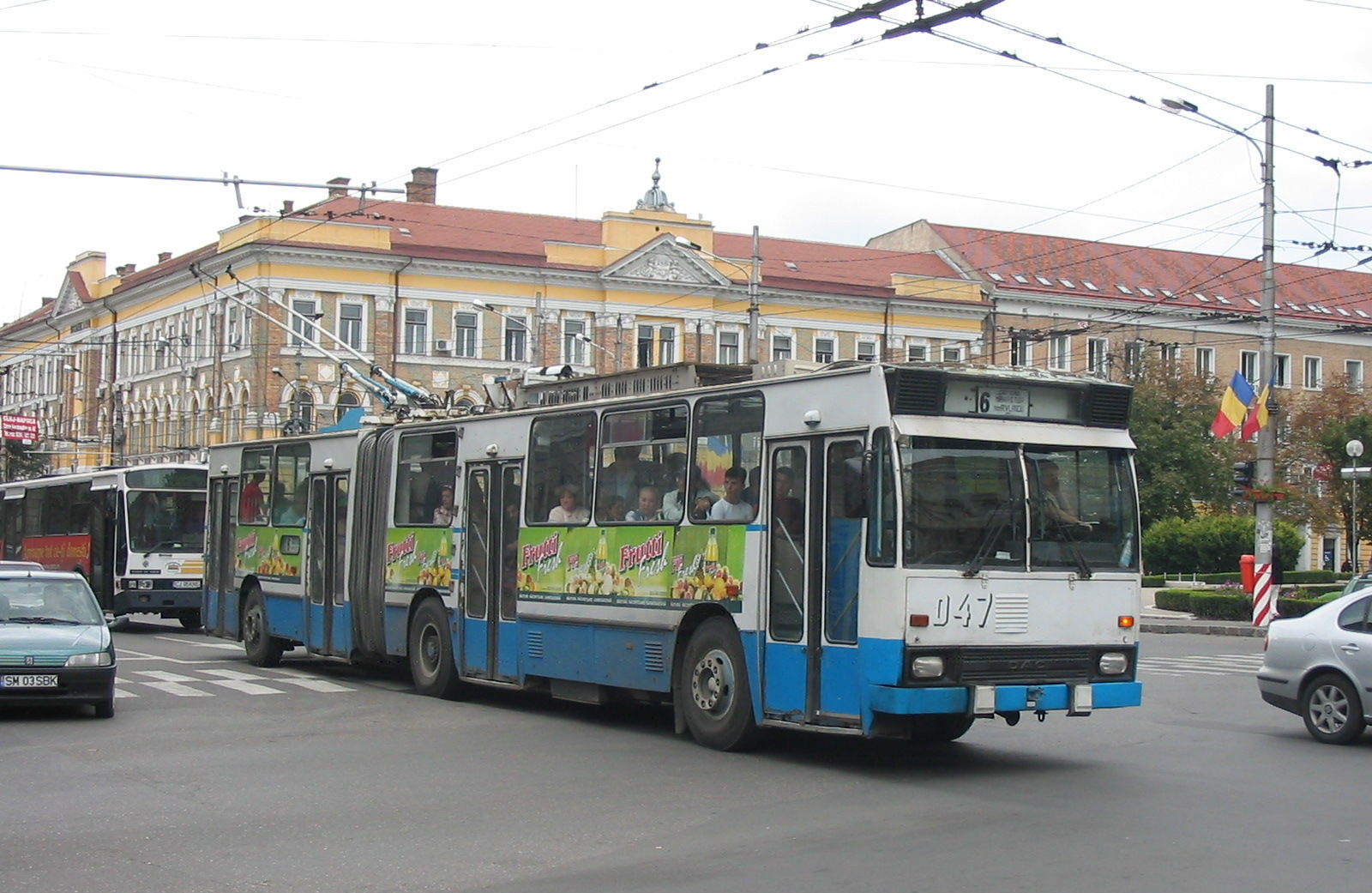
A Rocar bodied DAC trolley bus

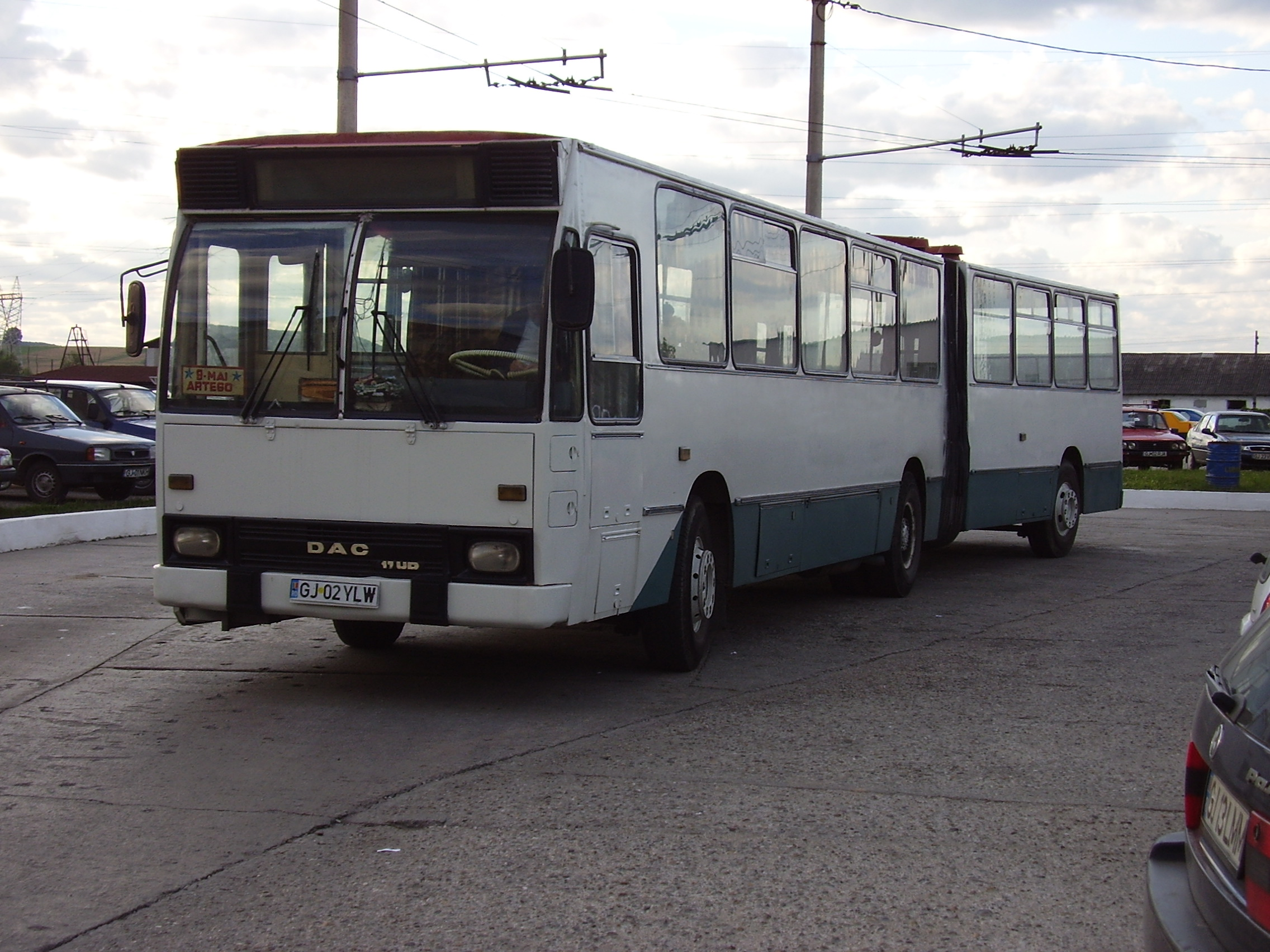
DAC 117UD articulated city bus

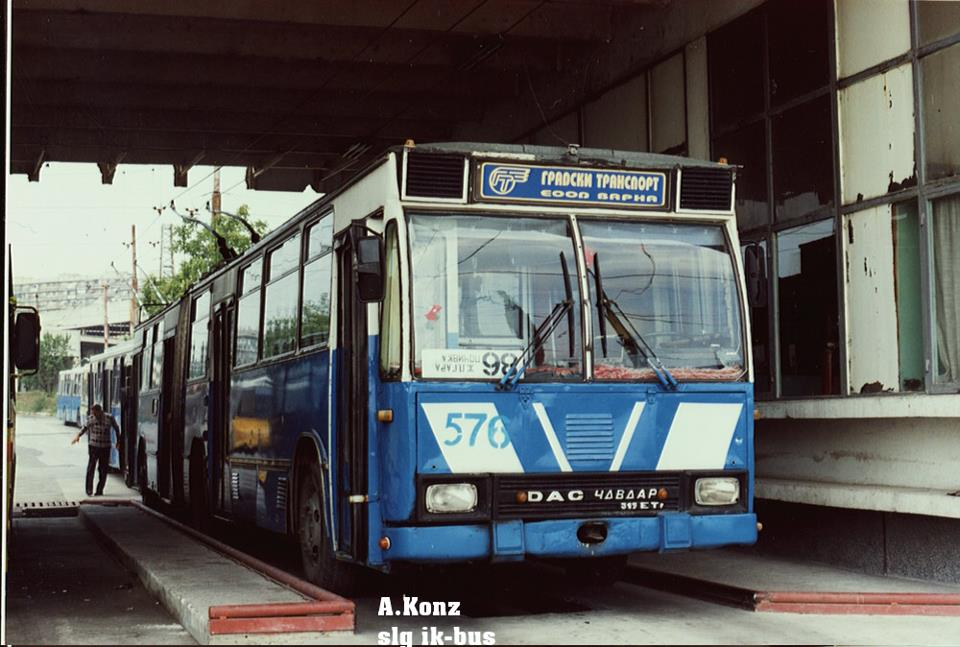
DAC-Chavdar 117 ET trolleybus in Bulgaria

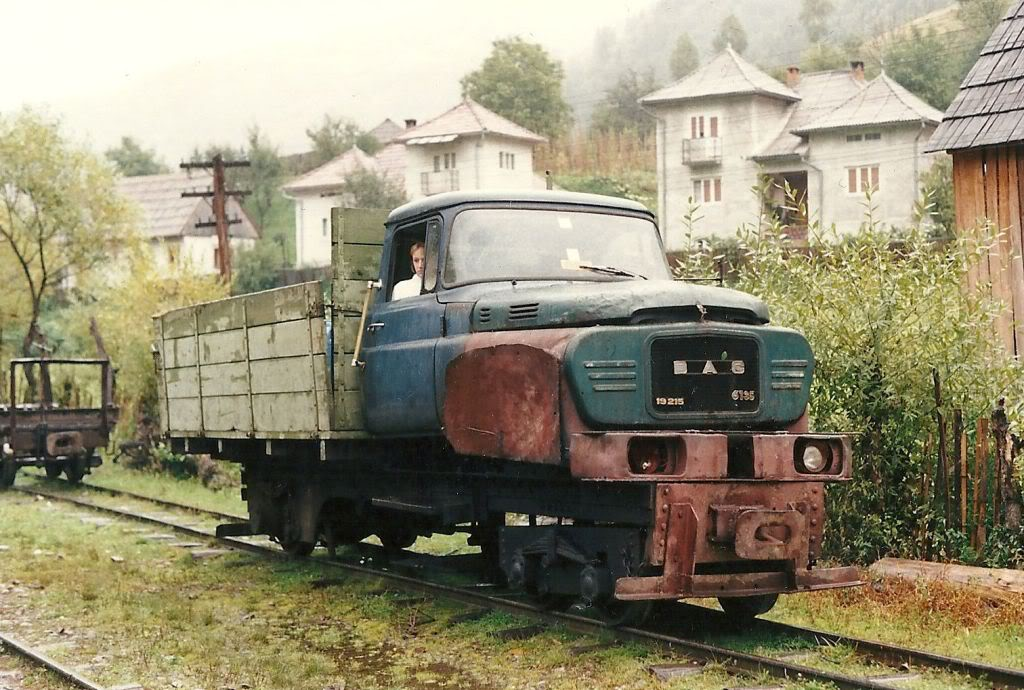
DAC 6135 transformed into railcar

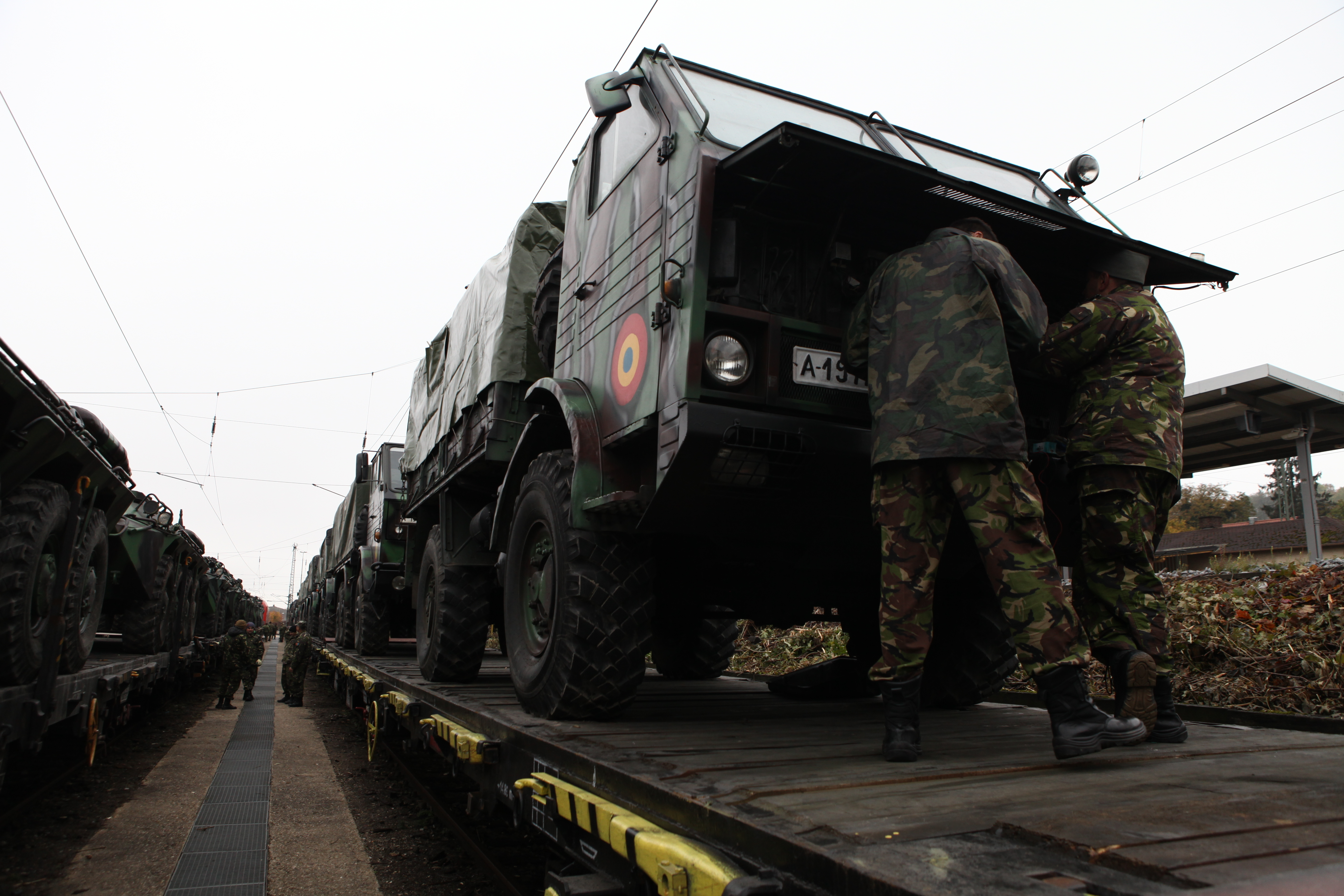
DAC-444T truck during exercise Combined Resolve V

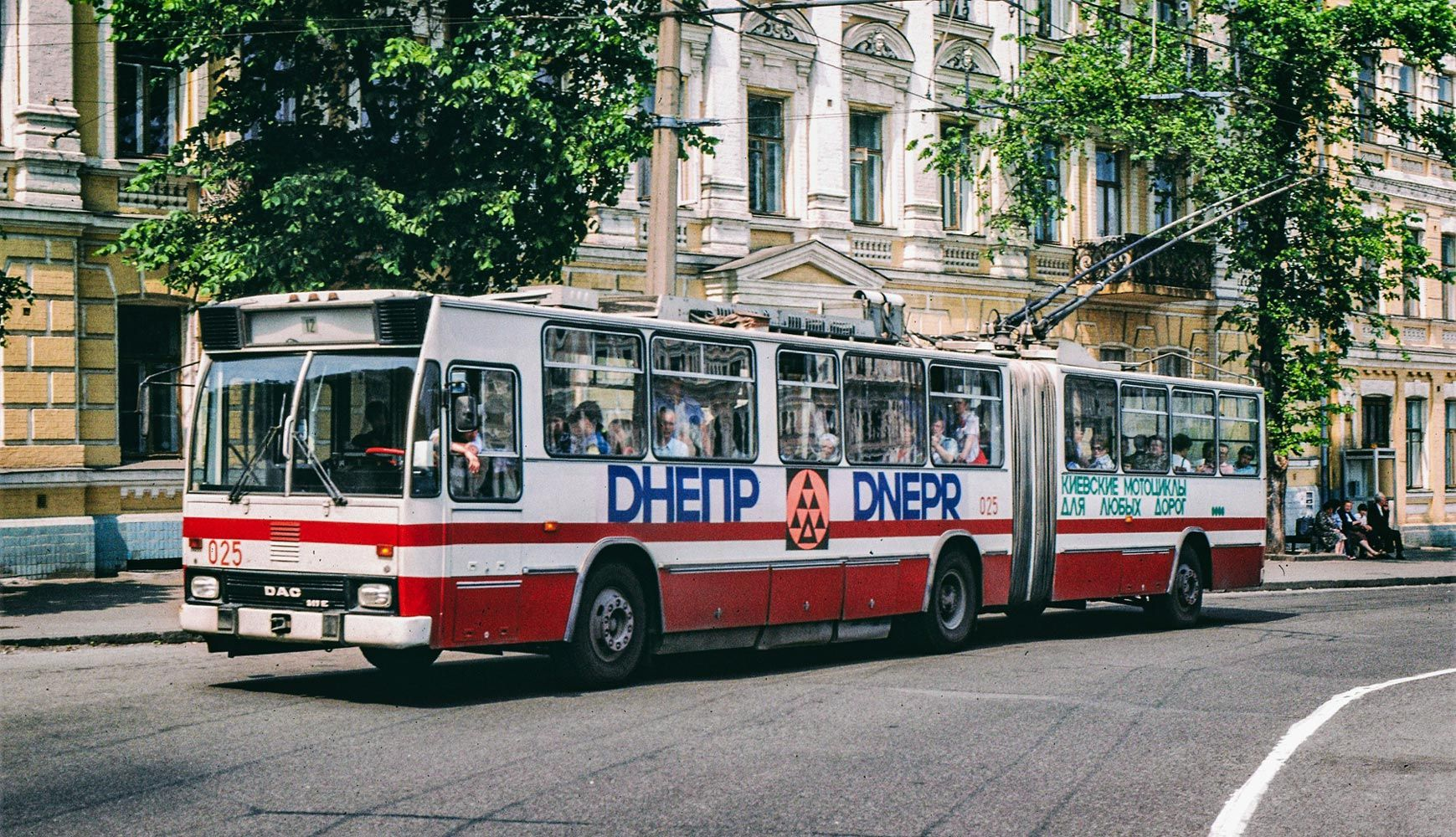
DAC 217E trolleybus in Kyiv, Ukraine

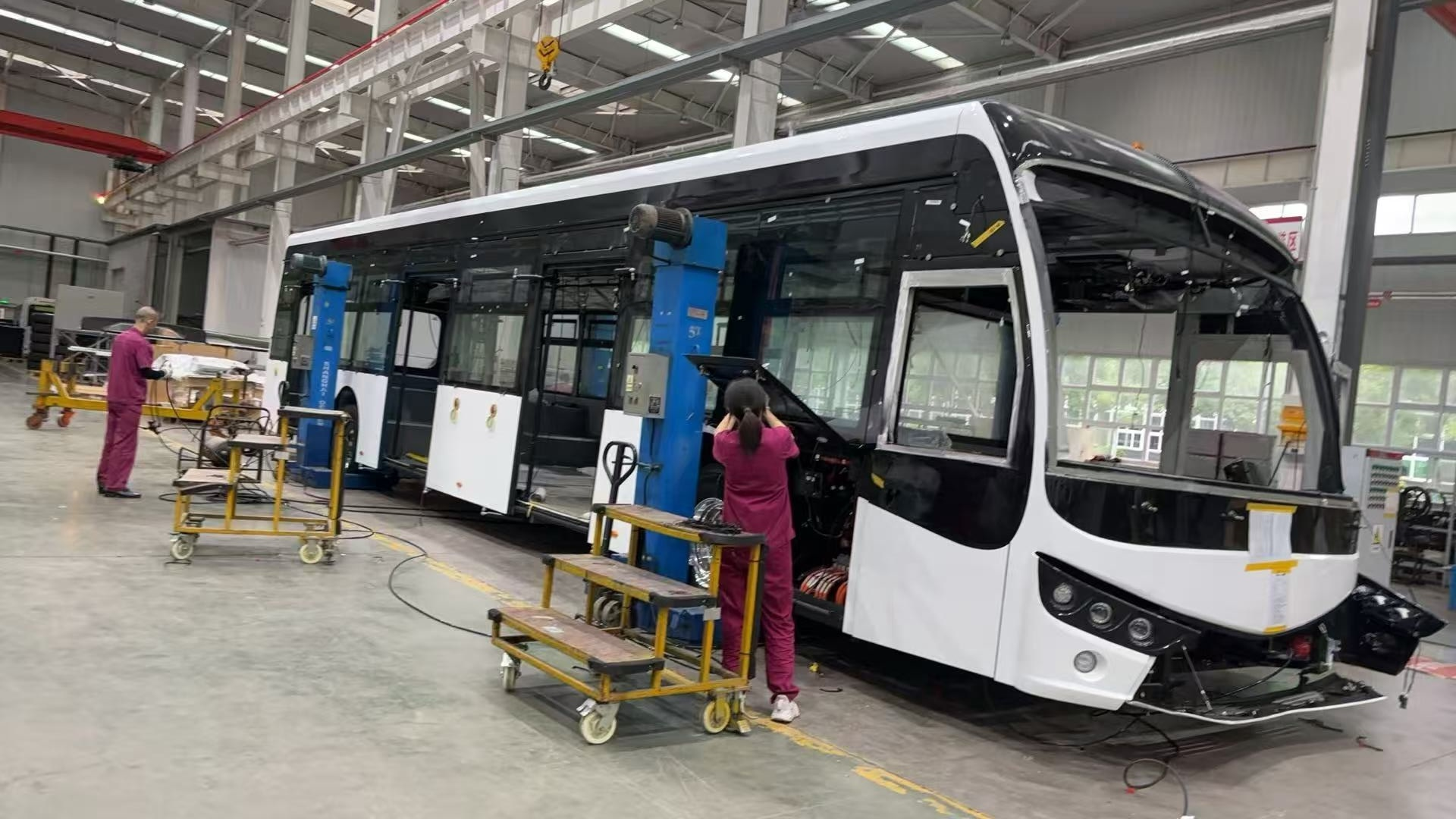
New DAC Aerobus 14.100EVA production

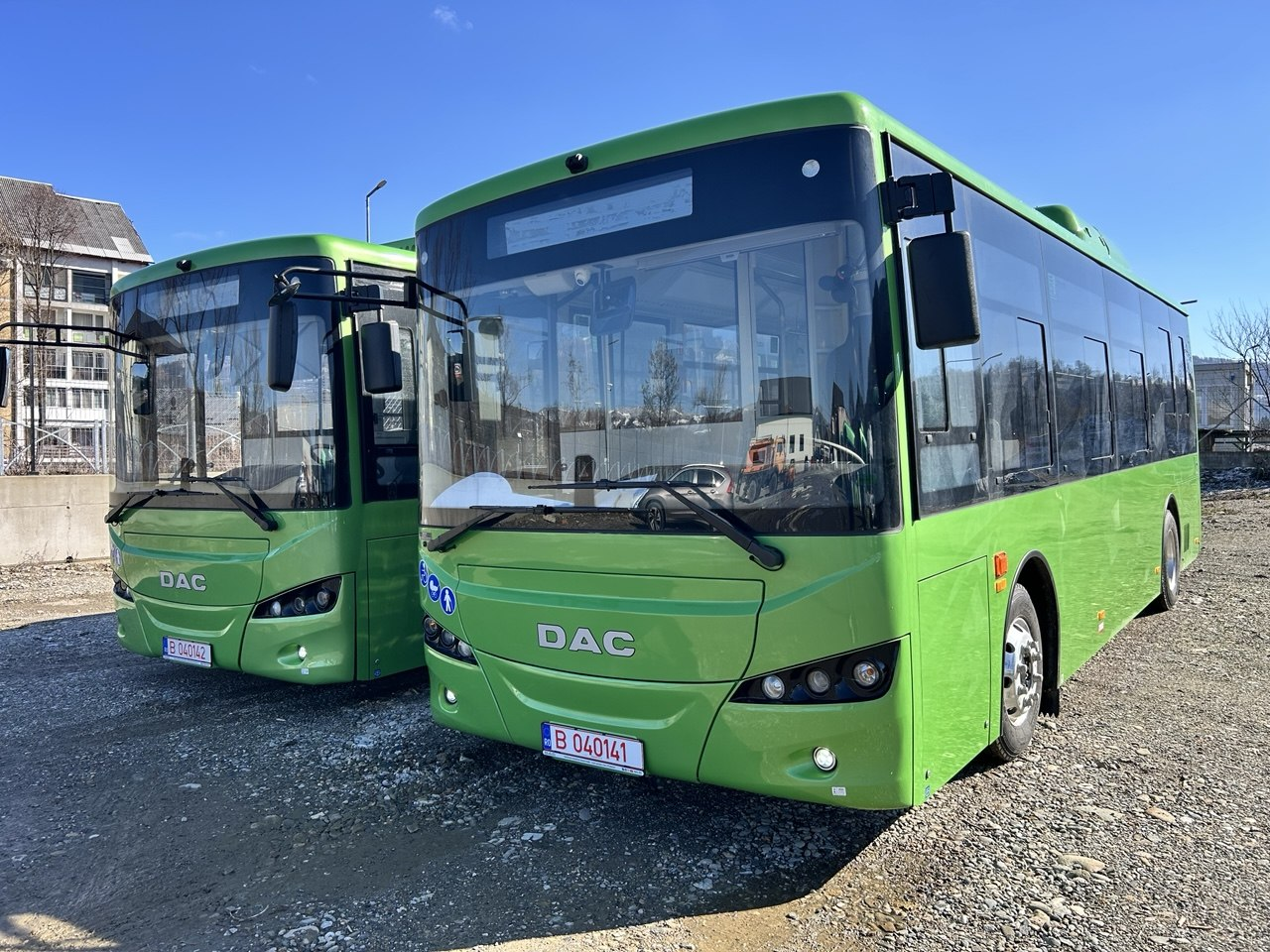
Electric city bus DAC 4085.60ULFE

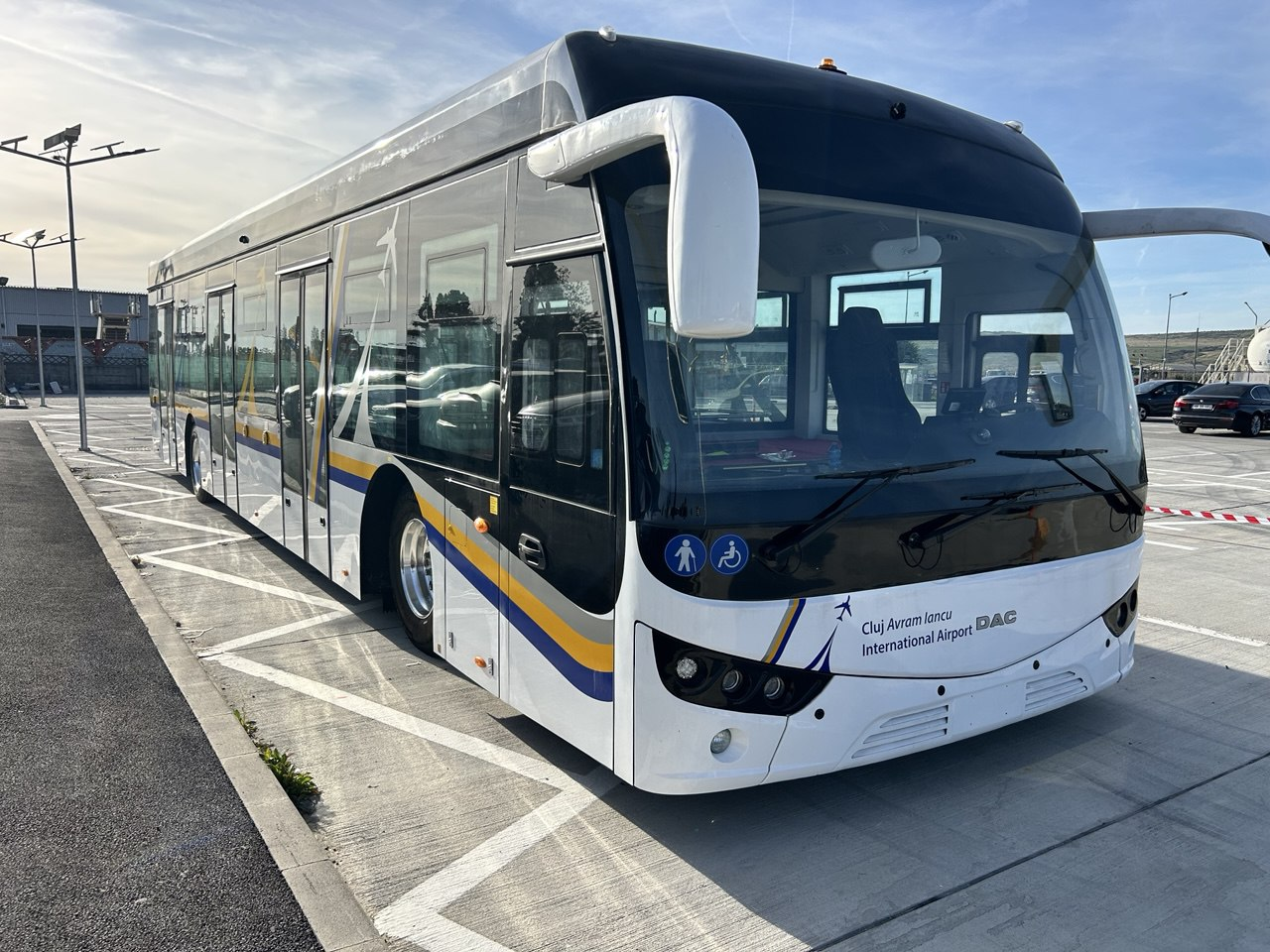
DAC Aerobus 14.100EVA electric apron bus in operation at Cluj "Avram Iancu" International Airport, Romania

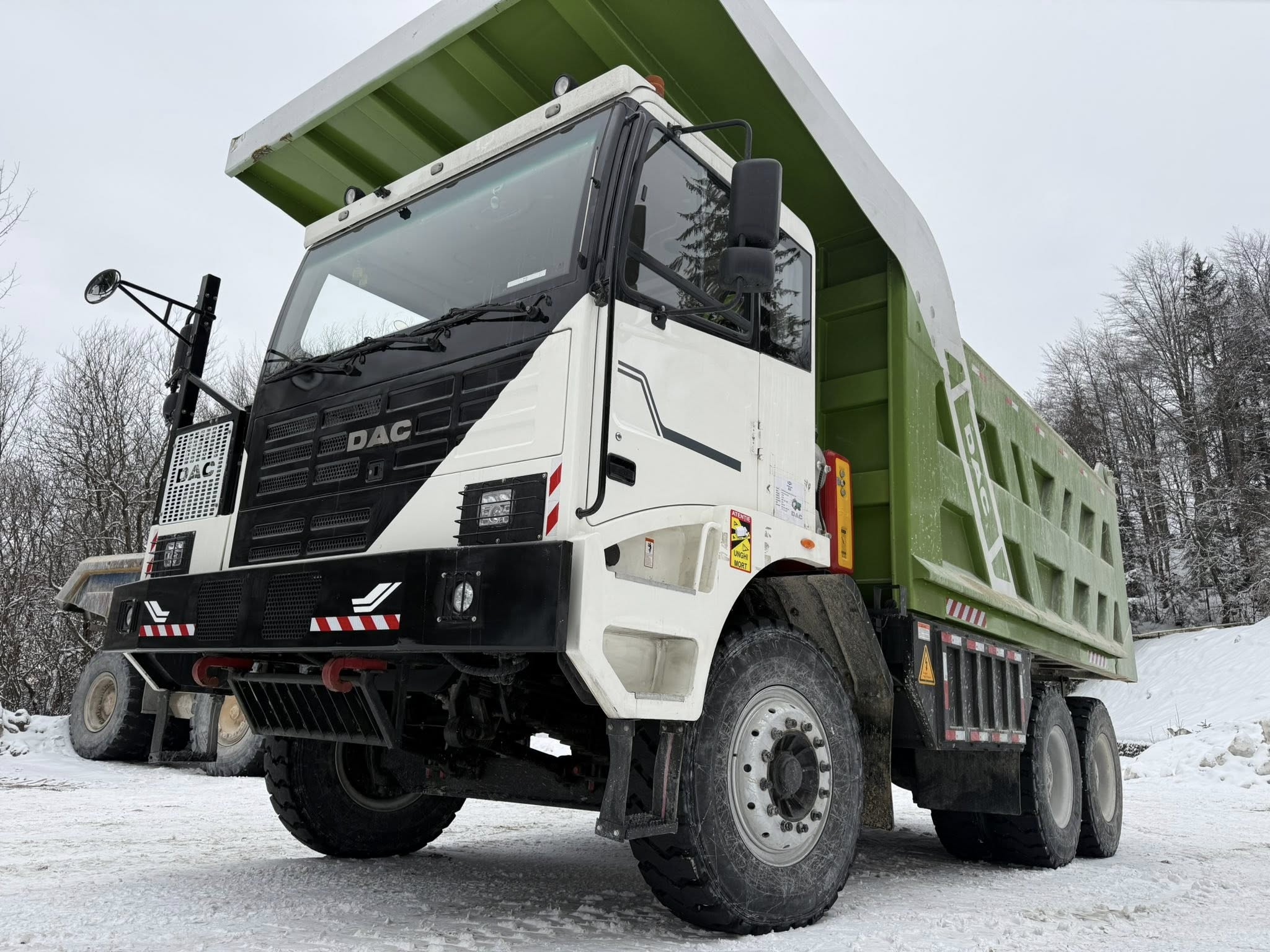
DAC 90TEF.OH electric mining truck

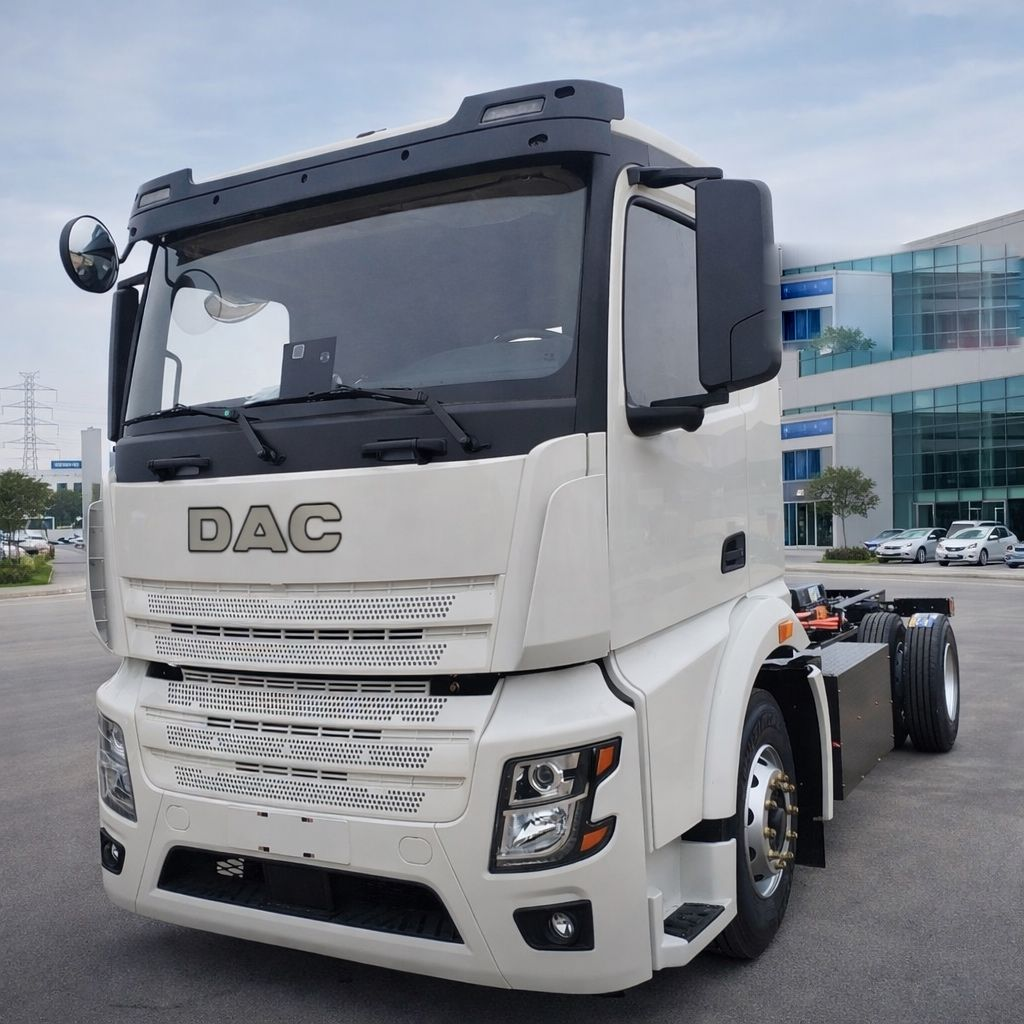
DAC Derzis 18.360 electric chassis

== See also ==
- Roman (vehicle manufacturer)
- Rocar DAC
- Automotive industry in Romania
