= DAC 6135 =

Romanian truck

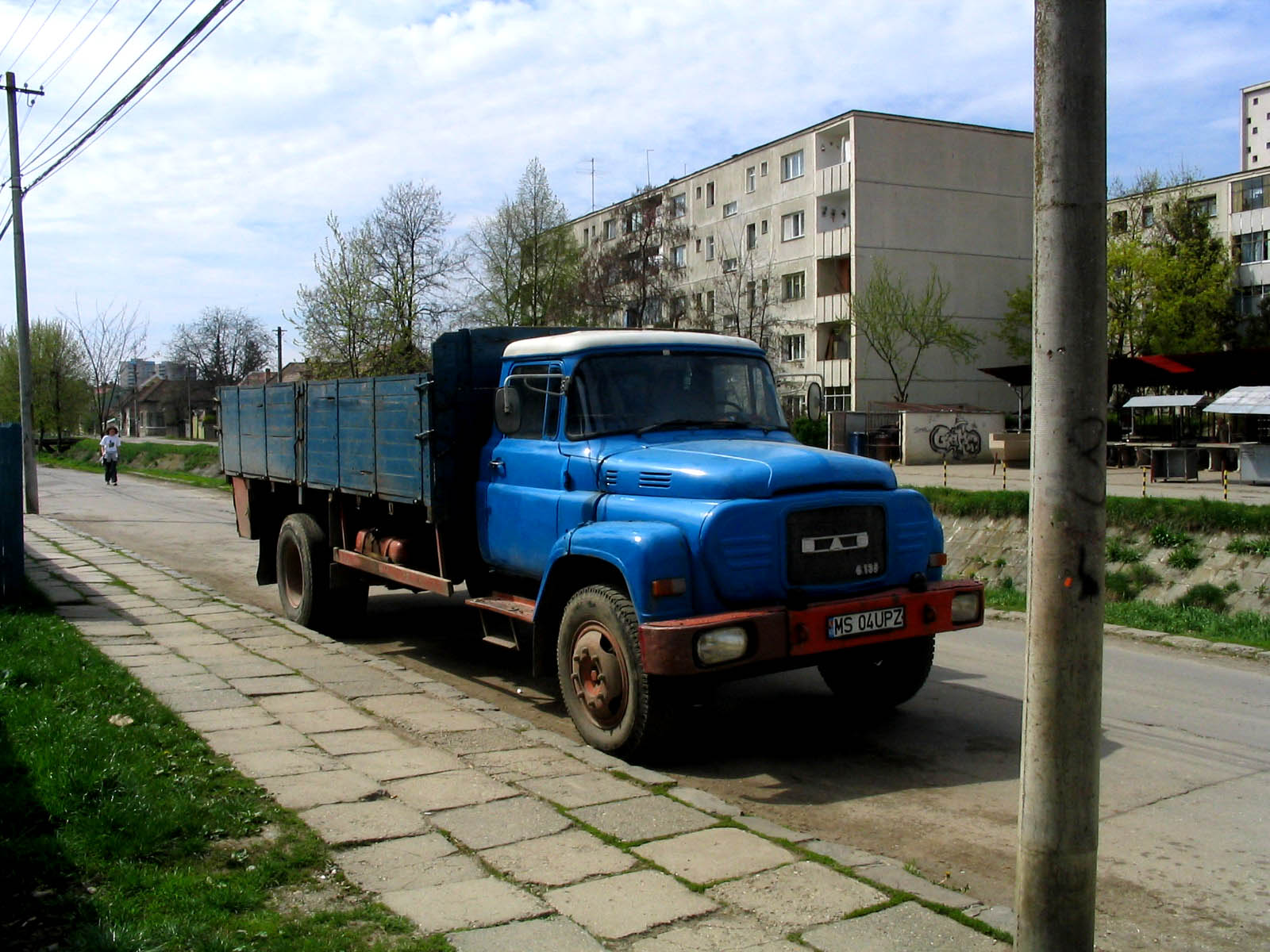
- A DAC 6135 in Târgu Mureș

Overview
- Manufacturer: DAC
- Model years: 1975–1992
- Assembly: Brașov, Romania

Body and chassis
- Body style: 2 door truck
- Layout: Longitudinal front-engine, rear-wheel drive; Longitudinal front-engine, four-wheel drive (6135RA and 6135RAN)
- Related: SR 113 Bucegi

Powertrain
- Engine: 5.5 L (340 cu in) I6, 99 kW (133 bhp)
- Transmission: 5 speed manual

Dimensions
- Wheelbase: 3,620 mm (142.5 in); 4,000 mm (157.5 in); 4,400 mm (173.2 in); 4,800 mm (189.0 in)
- Length: 5,580 mm (219.7 in); 6,915 mm (272.2 in); 7,433 mm (292.6 in); 8,207 mm (323.1 in)
- Width: 2,350 mm (92.5 in)
- Height: 2,350 mm (92.5 in)
- Curb weight: 9,450 kg (20,834 lb)

Chronology
- Predecessor: SR 113 Bucegi
- Successor: DAC 8135

The DAC 6135 was a Romanian truck that was produced from 1975 to 1992 by Diesel Auto Camion (DAC) in Brașov. It proved popular in Romania and was also exported. Based on the preceding SR 113 Bucegi of 1962 but powered by a 99 kW (133 bhp) 6-cylinder Saviem diesel engine, the truck could carry a payload of 6,000 kg (13,228 lb). It was available as the 6135R base model with three different wheelbases, a tipper and a tractor, as well as the four-wheel drive 6135RA and 6135RAN. The truck was to be succeeded by the more advanced 8135 in 1985, but stayed in limited production alongside it for several years.

== Design and development ==
In 1954, the Romanian truck manufacturer SR, (Romanian: Steagul Rosu, lit. 'Red Flag' named in honour of the Communist movement, introduced a 5,000 kg (11,023 lb) truck made in their factory in Brașov. The model, inspired by Russian designs, was available in a range of sizes, with either diesel or petrol engines. The SR 113 Bucegi of 1962 was typical. Powered by a 140 brake horsepower (104 kW) V8 gasoline engine, the truck had a capacity of 5,000 kg (11,023 lb). The truck was popular amongst users in Romania and was also exported by Kașinexport.

As the following decade progressed, and particularly after the 1973 oil crisis, there was a desire for vehicles with greater fuel efficiency. In consequence, in 1975, Diesel Auto Camion (DAC) introduced the 6135. Derived from the Bucegi, the new model replaced the V8 with a lighter and more fuel-efficient 6-cylinder engine, and had slight alterations to the grille. The 6135 was a normal control truck with a ladder type frame manufactured in four wheelbases: 3,620 mm (142.5 in), 4,000 mm (157.5 in), 4,400 mm (173.2 in) and 4,800 mm (189.0 in). These corresponded to three overall lengths: 5,580 mm (219.7 in), 6,915 mm (272.2 in), 7,433 mm (292.6 in) and 8,207 mm (323.1 in). Overall width and height to the top of the cab were both 2,350 mm (92.5 in). The 5,488 cc (335 in^{3}) 797-05 engine was a Saviem design and longitudinally mounted under the hood. Power output was 99 kW (133 bhp). Drive was to the rear wheels through a single plate clutch, five speed ZF manual transmission and two speed spiral bevel gears. The brakes were air-assisted. Maximum speed was 95 km/h (59 mph).

The steel cab accommodated three people. The basic model was termed the 6135R and had a load capacity of 6,000 kg (13,228 lb). The truck was also produced with a tipper as the 6135RK and as a tractor as the 6135RS. A four wheel drive version was also available named the 6135RA and 6135RAN.

== Production ==
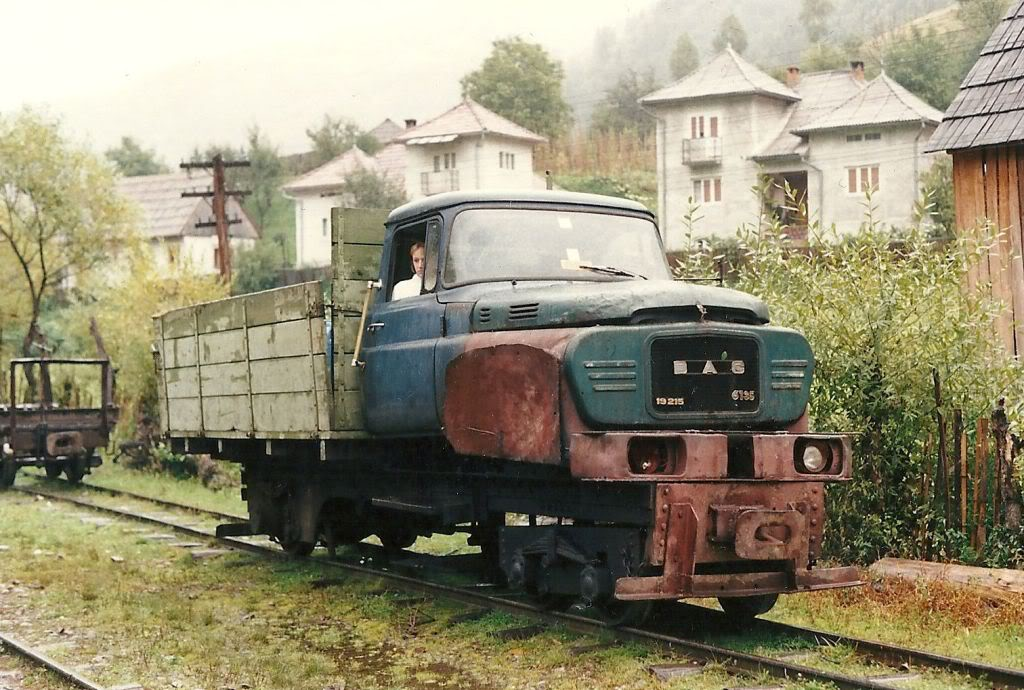
A 6135 equipped to operate on rail and tram tracks

Production commenced in 1975. The truck soon became popular, both as a general transport for goods, and in more specialised roles, including as a mobile workshop to support urban tram and trolleybus networks. The truck soon came to dominate the streets of Romania, particularly as a transport for bread and other foods. Improvements were made in 1980, when non-structural steel parts of the design, including the hood, were replaced by plastic, saving 1,000 kg (2,205 lb) in weight.

By 1983, the plant had been renamed Intreprindea de Autocamione Brasov. Production was to cease with the introduction of the 8135 as a replacement in 1985, but the popularity of the truck meant it was still manufactured, although in smaller quantities, throughout the decade. The truck was exported, increasingly helped by the favourable exchange rate of the Romanian lei, which meant the export price of a 6135N in 1988 was $4890. Exports continued after the Fall of the Berlin Wall, increasingly to Western countries like Germany and the United States, but against greater competition from more advanced products. In 1990, the manufacturer, now known as Roman, continued small scale production of the 6135 without change under the original brand DAC. However, the end was in sight. By 1992, production had ceased.
