= Transfer case =

Drivetrain used in four-wheel drive vehicles

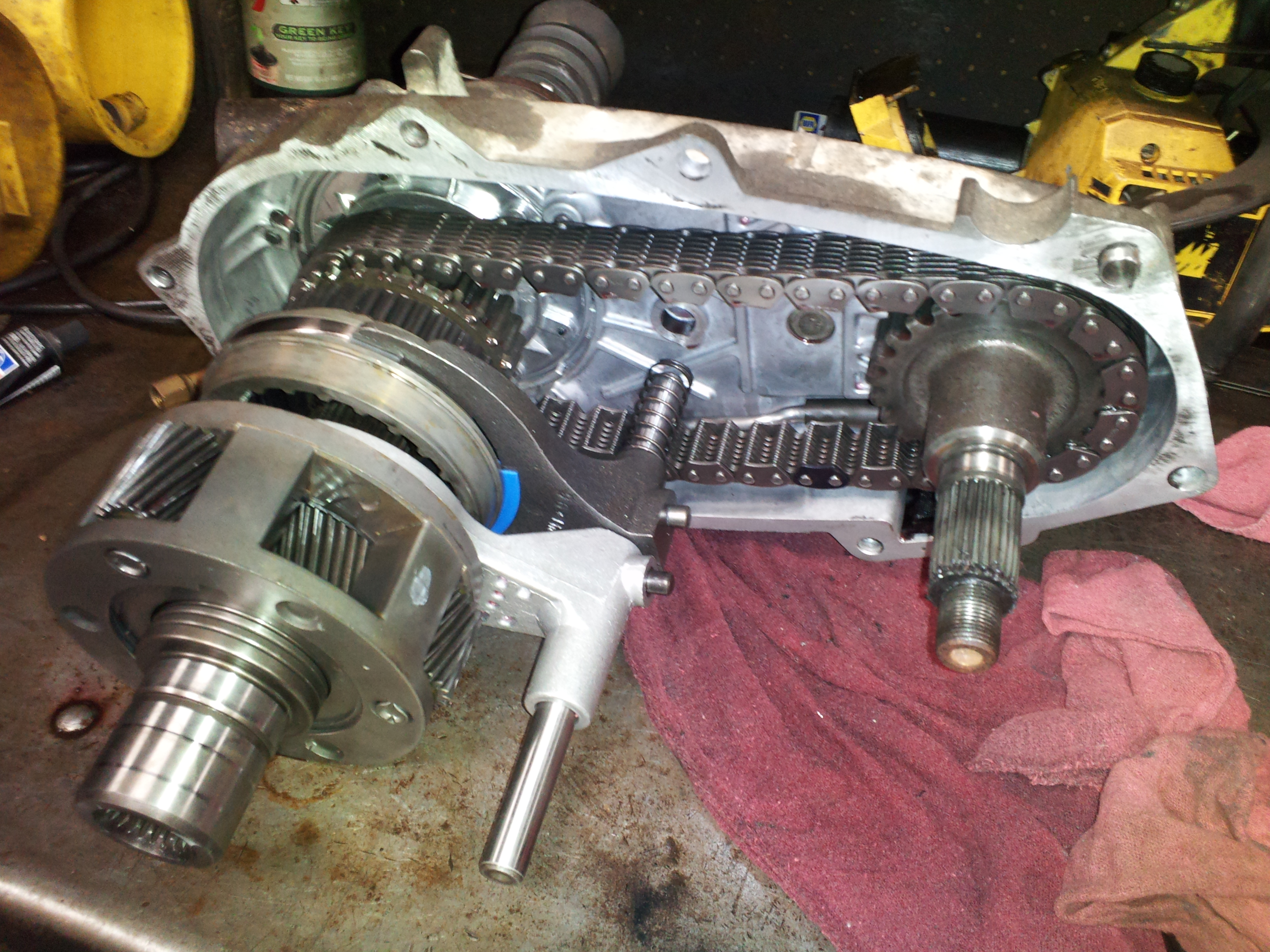
Inside of a 231 New Process Gear transfer case. Part-time/manual, shift on the fly

A transfer case is an intermediate gearbox that transfers power from the transmission of a motor vehicle to the driven axles of four-wheel-drive, all-wheel-drive, and other multi-axled on- and off-road machines. A part of the vehicle's drivetrain, it employs drive shafts to mechanically deliver motive power. The transfer case also synchronizes the difference between the rotation of the front and rear wheels (only high-speed 4WD-AWD systems), and may contain one or more sets of low range gears for off-road use.

== Functions ==
The transfer gearbox (a secondary transmission system) receives power from the transmission and sends it to both the front and rear axles, or just one (usually the rear.) This can be done with gears, hydraulics, or chain drive. On some vehicles, such as four-wheel-drive trucks or vehicles intended for off-road use, this feature is controlled by the driver. The driver can put the transfer case into either "two-wheel-drive" or "four-wheel-drive" mode. This was traditionally accomplished by means of a shifter, similar to that in a manual transmission. Increasingly it is electronically operated by a dashboard, center console, or shift lever switch.

A transfer case that allows alternating between 2-wheel drive and 4-wheel drive modes but lacks a center differential for coordinating axle speeds is known as "part-time". Some vehicles, such as all-wheel-drive (AWD) sports cars, have transfer cases that are not selectable, known as "full-time". Such a transfer case is permanently "locked" into AWD mode. In recent decades hybrids have been developed that share properties of each.

Transfer cases also perform other functions. Some are common to all types, others vary by type:

- The transfer case may contain one or more sets of low range gears for off-road use. Low range gears are engaged with a shifter or electronic switch. In many transfer cases, this shifter is the same as the one that selects 2WD or 4WD operation. Low range gears allow the vehicle to drive at much slower speeds while still operating within the usable power band / RPM range of the engine. This also increases the torque available at the axles. Low-range gears are used for very inclement road conditions, towing a heavy load slowly, driving on rough, unimproved roads slowly, and extreme off-road maneuvers such as rockcrawling. This feature is often absent on all-wheel-drive cars. Some very large vehicles, such as heavy equipment or military trucks, may have more than one set of low-range gears.
- The transfer case may require stopping entirely to engage four-wheel drive (or just low-range 4WD), slowing to a designated speed to engage or disengage an extra axle, or may permit full "shift-on-the-fly" engagement of high-range 4WD at any speed.
- Transfer cases that are designed to allow for normal road use synchronize the difference between the rotation of the front and rear wheels, in much the same way the differential acts on a given axle. This is necessary because the front and rear tires never turn at the same speed. Different rates of tire rotation are generally due to different tire diameters (since the front and rear tires inevitably wear at different rates) and different gear ratios in the front and rear differentials since manufacturers will often have a slightly lower ratio in the front vs. the rear to help with control (such as a 3.55:1 in the rear differential and a 3.54:1 in the front differential). If the transfer case did not make up the difference between the two different rates of rotation, binding would occur and the transfer case could become damaged. This is also why a transfer case that is not designed for on-road use will cause problems with driveline windup if driven on dry pavement.
- Most traditional transfer cases designed for off-road include the ability to mechanically lock the front and rear drive shafts to evenly distribute output speed (and differentiate torque) between them. This is similar to the differential lock's ability to force both wheels of an axle to turn simultaneously by locking them together, only between axles instead of wheels.
- A part-/full-time hybrid transfer case enables a vehicle to operate in two-wheel drive, full-time four-wheel drive (with the center differential open) and part-time four-wheel drive (with the center diff locked) in both high- and low-ranges.

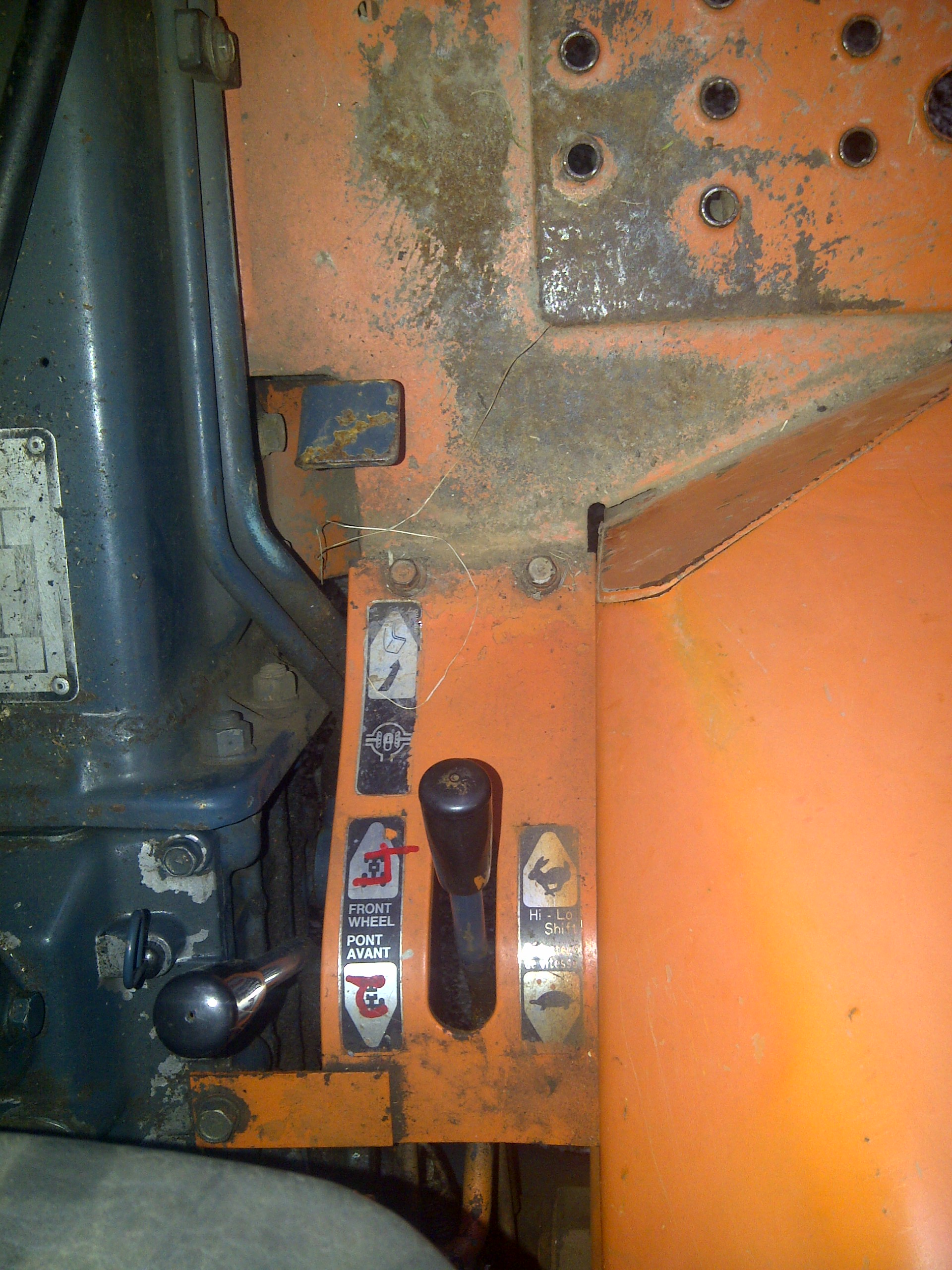
The levers on a Kubota tractor for selecting between 2WD and 4WD (left) and high and low gear ranges (right) are connected to the transfer case . The transfer case is currently in high-range, rear-wheel-drive.

== Types ==
Transfer cases used on "part-time" four-wheel-drive off-road vehicles such as trucks and some specialty military vehicles generally allow the driver to select 2WD or 4WD, as well as high or low gear ranges. Automated versions used in sports cars and performance sedans are usually "transparent" to the driver; there is no shifter or select lever.

=== Drive types ===
==== Gear-driven ====
There are two different types of internal power-transfer mechanisms found in most transfer cases. Gear-driven transfer cases use sets of gears to drive either the front or both the front and rear driveshafts. These are generally strong, heavy units that are used in large trucks, but there are currently several gear drive cases in production for passenger cars.

==== Chain-driven ====
Chain-driven transfer cases use a chain to drive most often only one axle but can drive both axles. Chain-driven transfer cases are quieter and lighter than gear-driven ones. They are used in vehicles such as compact trucks, full-size trucks, Jeeps, and SUVs. Some off-road driving enthusiasts modify their vehicles to use gear-driven transfer cases, accepting the additional weight and noise to gain the extra strength they generally provide.

=== Housing type ===
==== Married ====
Transfer cases are also classified as either "divorced"/independent or "married". Married transfer cases are bolted directly to the transmission, usually between the transmission's output shaft and the rear or main driveshaft. Sometimes a married transfer case is an integral part of the transmission and the two components share the same housing or "case", as is commonly found on recent Subaru products and some other all-wheel-drive cars.

==== Divorced/independent ====
A divorced or independent transfer case is completely separate from the transmission. It is located further down the driveline than a married transfer case and connected to the transmission output shaft by a short driveshaft. Independent transfer cases are used on very long wheelbase vehicles, such as commercial trucks or military trucks. This setup is also optimal for modified 4x4 because it's easier to change engine and transmissions, preserving the original 4WD system.

=== Transfer case shift type ===
==== Manual shift on-the-fly ====
Manual shift on-the-fly (MSOF) transfer cases have a selector lever on the driver's side floor transmission hump and may also have either two sealed automatic front axle locking hubs or two manual front axle hub selectors of lock and unlock or free. To engage the four-wheel-drive system the vehicle must be moving at a low speed. The speed at which 4x4 can be engaged depends on the vehicle. This is only for the four-wheel-drive high setting. To engage the four-wheel-drive low setting, the vehicle must be stopped and the transmission must be shifted to neutral, then the four-wheel-drive low can be selected.

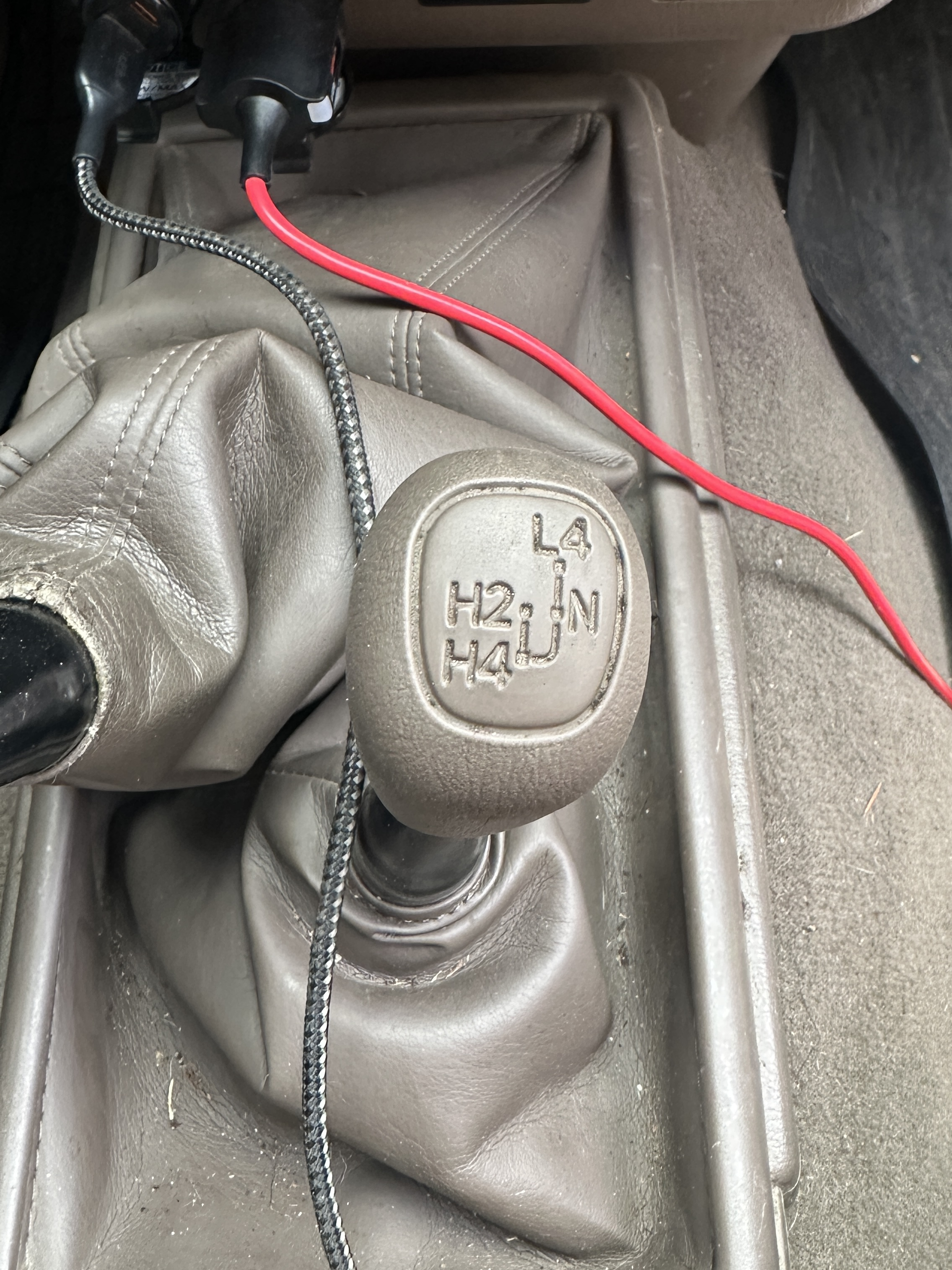
MSOF selector lever with a J shift pattern from a 2004 Toyota Tacoma

==== Electronic shift on-the-fly ====
Electronic shift on-the-fly (ESOF) transfer cases have a dash-mounted selector switch or buttons with front sealed automatic locking axle hubs or drive flanges. Unlike the manual transfer case, this system has a transfer case motor. To engage the four-wheel-drive system the vehicle must be moving at a lower speed. The speed at which 4x4 can be engaged depends on the vehicle. This is only for the four-wheel-drive high setting. To engage the four-wheel-drive low setting, the vehicle must be stopped and the transmission must be shifted to neutral, then the four-wheel-drive low can be selected.

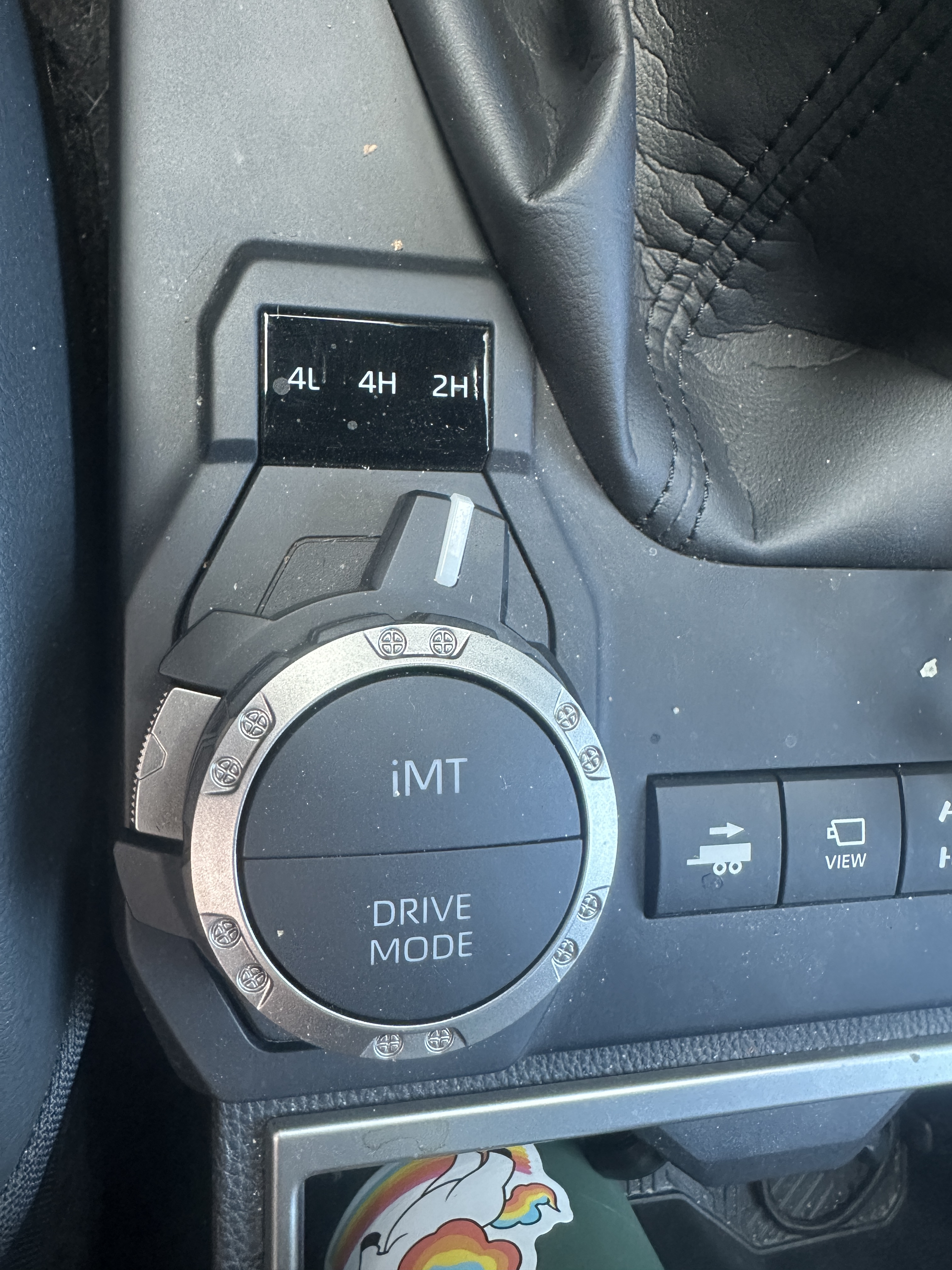
ESOF rotary selector from a 2026 Toyota Tacoma

== See also ==
- AMC and Jeep transmissions
- Clutch
- Gear box
- Jeep four-wheel-drive systems
- List of auto parts
- Mitsubishi Super Select
- New Venture Gear
