= Pindad SS4 =

Pindad SS4 Battle Rifle
- Type: Battle rifle
- Place of origin: Indonesia

Production history
- Designer: PT Pindad
- Manufacturer: PT Pindad
- Produced: TBA

Specifications
- Mass: 3,4 kg (loaded)
- Cartridge: 7.62×51mm NATO
- Action: Gas-operated, rotating bolt
- Rate of fire: 750 rpm
- Effective firing range: 300-600m
- Feed system: 15-round box magazine, 30-round box magazine
- Sights: Iron sights, but optical sights are possible with the Picatinny rail provision.

The SS4 (short for Indonesian: Senapan Serbu 4, "Assault Rifle 4") is a battle rifle being developed by PT Pindad.

== Design ==
The new rifle will use 7.62×51mm NATO round, have an adjustable buttstock unlike the other SS series which have fixed elevated buttstock, an adjustable iron sights, a tripod might become a permanent accessory.

Though the name bore the series name the SS (Senapan Serbu) meaning Assault Rifle it is actually a Battle Rifle (Senapan Tempur in Indonesian) which have an effective range up to 300–600 meters. PT Pindad promises that the new rifle will have three variant:

- Riflemen variant will have an effective range up to 100-300 meter.
- Marksmen variant will have an effective range up to 300-600 meter.
- Sniper variant will have an effective range up to 600-1000 meter.

== See also ==
- List of battle rifles
- Pindad SS1
- Pindad SS2
- Pindad SS3
