= Super Select =

4WD system by Mitsubishi

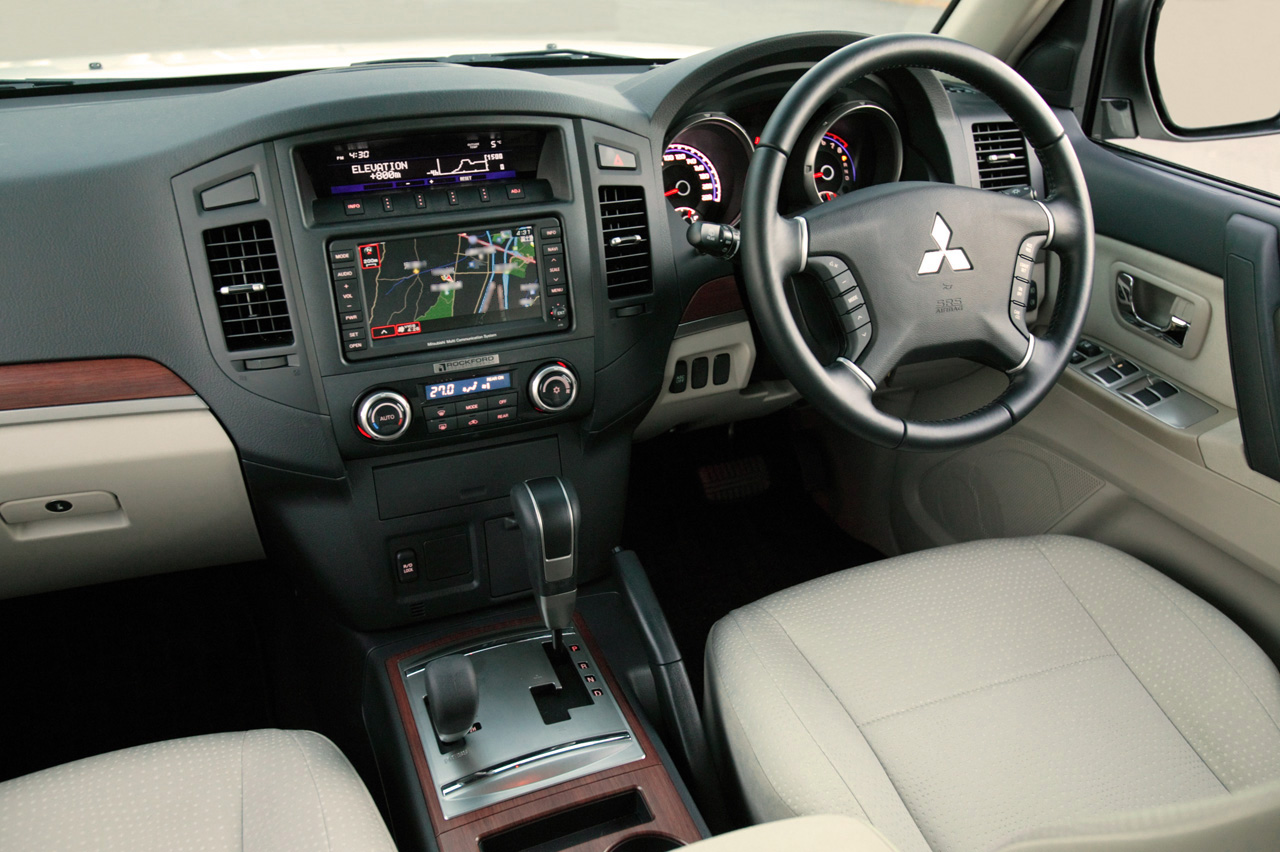
The interior of a 2007 Mitsubishi Pajero, with the Super Select gearlever visible to the left of the INVECS transmission lever.

Super Select is the brand name of a four-wheel drive system produced by Mitsubishi Motors, used worldwide except for North America, where it was initially known as Active-Trac. It was first introduced in 1991 with the then-new second generation of the Mitsubishi Pajero.

The system offers a choice of four rear- or four-wheel driving modes with both high and low ranges, selected using a lever mounted alongside the gear shift lever, both in motion or stopped (depending on the mode to be selected).

The system differs significantly from 'traditional' 4WD systems in that it offers more driven-axle modes in both high and low ranges than most other part-time systems on the market. The system features 4 modes: 2H, 4H, 4HLc and 4LLc. On early models, a neutral position for the transfer case was also selectable.

== Modes ==
2H: 2WD, high range. 100% of available power is sent to the rear axle.

4H: 4WD, high range. Power is sent to both the front and rear axles while the centre differential remains unlocked.

4HLc: 4WD, high range, locked centre differential. Power is sent to the front and rear axles with the centre differential locked, ensuring that a percentage of power is still sent to the forward axles even if a rear wheel is spinning (and vice versa).

4LLc: 4WD, low range, locked centre differential. Power is sent to the front and rear axles with the centre differential locked, ensuring that a percentage of power is still sent to the forward axles even if a rear wheel is spinning (and vice versa) however the gearing ratio is doubled, increasing torque by more than 2x and reducing speed in each of the gears by the same factor.

== Usage ==
2H is intended for normal daily use around town for better fuel economy and where loss of traction is not a concern. Mitsubishi (like other manufacturers) does not recommend that 2WD be used when towing as it can cause excessive heat and wear on the differential.

4H is intended for use on gravel, wet roads, snowy or dusty conditions. In fact Mitsubishi recommends this mode for almost all situations due to the enhanced handling and safety and lower drivetrain strain when towing. Unlike many part-time 4WD systems, 4H can be used on tarmac and hard surfaces without the risk of damaging the transfer case through gearbox windup (excessive, uneven torque applied to the transfer input/output shafts through the difference in rotation speeds of each wheel when on a high-grip surface that cannot relieve this through slippage on the terrain itself). 4H can be used in moderate off-road situations where extra traction is desired, however as the centre differential remains unlocked, a single slipping wheel will result in power being fed to that wheel, halting forward progress (unless other traction aids are used). Depending on the version of Super Select, the operator can shift between 2H and 4H at speeds of up to either 80km/h or 100km/h.

4HLc is intended for high speed operation (~50km/h) in more challenging terrain such as mud, fording water, rutted or off camber terrain and snow where low speed operation is not necessary or possible. This mode is not to be used on tarmac and sealed surfaces due to the centre differential being locked.

4LLc is to be used for extreme off-roading <30km/h. This doubles torque sent to the wheels while halving the speed. This mode is to be used in deep mud, rock climbing, steep hills, deep ruts, heavy snow and recovery situations. Not to be used on tarmac and sealed surfaces.

== System operation and mechanics ==
In early versions of Super Select such as found in the generation 2 Pajero, transfer-case neutral can be selected. On later models (generation 3 and up) this is not an option, only transmission neutral.

Shift operation in early version is done through a gated lever. Beginning in 2H at the rear-most position, the operator can push one notch forward into 4H without any lockout. To select 4HLc, the operator then pushes the lever sideways and forward into 4HLc, also without lockout. In this position 4LLc is locked out. In order to shift into 4LLc, the operator pushes directly downward on the lever to bypass the lockout and forward into the 4LLc position. To return, the operator simply pulls backward on the lever, no lockout needs to be bypassed.

In newer versions of Super Select such as in generation 4 Pajeros, there is a straight forward/backward travel with lockout on every position. The operator simply presses down and slides the lever forward into the desired position and does the same to return.

In the most modern versions of Super Select such as in Pajero Sport and Tritons, selection is done via an electronic rotary dial. 4HLc and 4LLc are locked out and require a downward press to bypass.

On all versions, 4WD engagement is done via solenoid-activated vacuum actuators and physical linkages on the transfer case. Though on rotary dial models these linkages are electronically shifted via servos. Due to the combination of dog clutches and vacuum actuation, internal friction/tension can cause slow engagement at the diff when shifting at a standstill (as must be done when entering or exiting low-range) while shifting-on-the-fly is usually instant. Mitsubishi officially recommends shifting to neutral before engaging the low range mode, however some owners recommend shifting into forward or reverse and idling 30cm or so in that direction to assist engagement.

In 2H and 4H mode the right hand side front axle is disconnected and connected via a dog clutch mechanism on the front differential. Vehicles with Super Select feature 'drive flanges' which are splined hubs without hub-freewheeling. This results in a much stronger hub/axle assembly and greater reliability however means that the left hand side axle is always driven. The small loss in fuel economy when in 2WD due to spinning the left axle is considered negligible and outweighed by the strength and convenience advantages.

Reduced frictional losses in the drivetrain mean that fuel economy improves while noise levels are reduced. It is a full-time four-wheel drive mode using a viscous coupling unit (VCU) and center differential to direct drive to the front wheels when the rear axle loses traction, and is capable of handling a wide variety of road conditions and speeds.(Note: The 4H mode can be used all the time without the common drivetrain 'binding' associated with other traditional 4WD modes). 4HLc is a part-time four-wheel drive mode that locks the center differential to provide extra traction for sandy, snowy or poorly surfaced roads in "high range" mode, while 4LLc, the "low range" mode, also offers a much lower gearing, providing the maximum amount of traction. Changing between 4HLc and 4LLc is only possible with the vehicle stationary (Note: 4HLc and 4LLc are your more traditional four-wheel drive modes, and should never be used on high traction road surfaces, as drivetrain 'binding' damage will occur).

== Function when off road ==
Engagement of 4HLc or 4LLc automatically switches Mitsubishi's traction control into off-road mode for vehicles equipped with MATT (Mitsubishi All-Terrain Technology). This mode disables stability control and modifies the way traction control is implemented. When a wheel loses traction, the operator must increase throttle input slightly, MATT will then bring the slipping wheel to a halt, sending power to the opposite wheel, periodically releasing the braking on the slipping wheel to check if traction has been regained. The system operates at a rapid speed and comes close to differential locker performance in most terrains.

If fitted with a factory differential lock, activating this will disable the off-road traction control mode. For this reason, unless an additional selectable front locker is fitted, MATT is preferred due to its high performance and action on all four wheels. As MATT uses the ABS system to rapidly apply and reapply braking force, in extremely slippery surfaces or when the wrong mode is selected (e.g. high range when it should be low range, resulting in excessive wheel speed and slip) the system's constant and rapid brake application on a constantly slipping wheel over an extended period of time (>1min continuously) can result in a short, temporarily low brake vacuum level. This is made known to the operator through a high pitched cabin alarm. In this situation the operator should stop the vehicle for 15~30 seconds to allow for brake vacuum to be recovered. This occurrence is very rare and if encountered is an indication that another method of self-recovery should be looked at.

The system has built-in fault detection and a type of failover to mechanical systems. In the event of a vacuum solenoid failure, the vehicle will remain in the axle configuration last selected (2WD or 4WD) and the centre diff light will flash continuously indicating a fault. For this reason, if travelling into a remote location, it is advisable to use at least 4H so that in the rare event of a solenoid failure on the track, all the core 4WD modes of 4H, 4HLc and 4LLc will still be selectable as high and low ranges and the centre differential are manually selected via linkage and not dependent on electronics (with the exception of the most modern rotary dial models).

The system is used on Mitsubishi's Pajero iO mini SUV, while its larger Pajero, Challenger, Triton and Delica models use a more complex system dubbed Super Select II (SS4-II). In most respects the two are the same, although the torque-split in SS4-II is 33/67 front/rear, meaning two thirds of the torque is channelled to the rear axle. In Super Select (SS4i) the torque-split is an equal 50/50. SS4-II also offers an option to lock the rear differential, offering greater traction to the rear axle.
