= Automotive industry in Romania =

Much of the Romanian manufacturing industry consists of branch plants of foreign firms, though there are some important domestic manufacturers, such as Automobile Dacia, Ford Romania, Roman Braşov and Igero. In 2018, est. 500,000 automobiles were produced in Romania.

- ARO
- Cibro
- DAC
- Dacia
- El Car
- Internațional Motors
- Lăstun
- Malaxa
- Oltcit
- Roman

== Overview ==
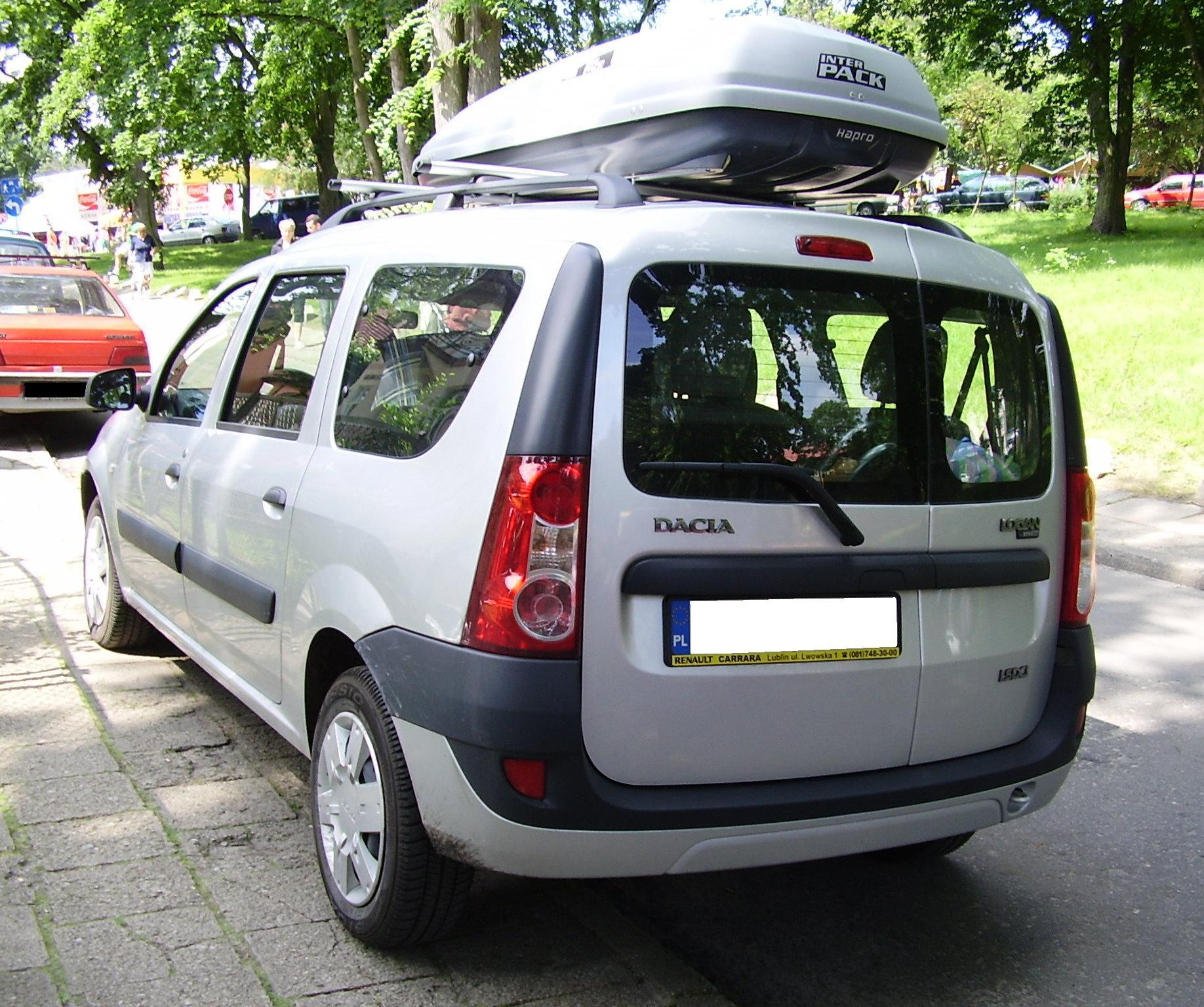
Dacia Logan MCV

During the Communist period, Romania was one of the largest automobile producers in Central and Eastern Europe, however the industry declined after the 1989 revolution. Previously, other domestic manufacturers such as Tractorul Braşov, ARO and Oltcit existed, however they eventually went bankrupt due to botched privatization in the 1990s. Since 1990, several foreign companies, including Mercedes, Audi, Hyundai, Volvo, Toyota, and Peugeot, expressed interest in opening branch plants in Romania. In 2014, the Romanian automotive industry ranks fifth in Central and Eastern Europe, behind that of the Czech Republic, Slovakia, and Poland.

Ford bought the Automobile Craiova plant for $57 million, planning to produce automobiles at a rate of over 300,000 units a year by 2010. Ford said it would invest €675 million (US$923 million) in the former Daewoo car factory and that it would buy supplies from the Romanian market worth €1 billion (US$1.39 billion). In September 2009, the company began to assemble the Ford Transit Connect in Craiova, and in 2012, production of the new Ford B-Max was started.

Robert Bosch GmbH, the world’s largest supplier of automotive components will invest as much as 60 million euros ($79 million) in a new factory in Jucu - Romania. The new Bosch facility will produce electronic components for automobiles, and will create about 2,000 jobs.

Dacia Logan was the top-selling new car in Central and Eastern Europe in the first half of 2007 with 52,750 units sold, ahead of Skoda Fabia (41,227 units), Skoda Octavia (33,483 units), Opel Astra (16,442 units) and Ford Focus (14,909 units).

In 2012, Dacia launched four new models, the Lodgy and the Dokker, and the second generations of the Logan and Sandero, whereas Ford launched their new mini MPV, the B-Max. Both manufacturers also introduced two new and technologically advanced turbocharged three-cylinder petrol engines (the 1.0-litre EcoBoost and the 0.9-litre TCe engine), which are locally produced and represented premieres in their segments.

== Active manufacturers ==
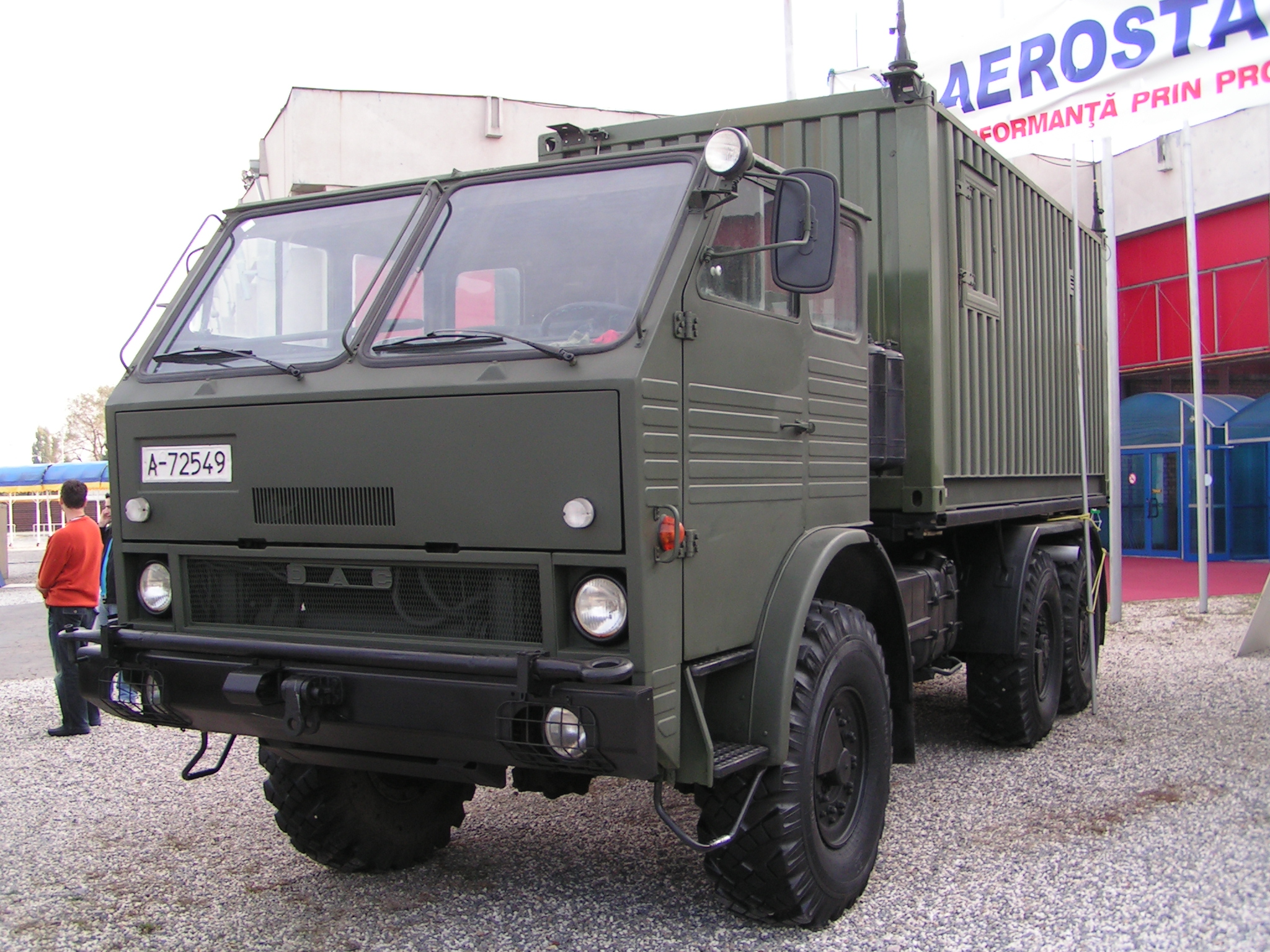
DAC shelter carrier

- Astra
- Cibro
- DAC
- Dacia
- El Car
- Ford Romania
- Grivbuz
- ROMAN
- ATP Trucks

== Production data ==
	2025	2024	2023	2022	2021	2020
Cars		560,102	513,050	509,465	420,755	438,107
Commercial vehicles		0	0	0	0	0
Total		560,102	513,050	509,465	420,755	438,107
Growth		9%	1%	21%	-4%	-11%

	2019	2018	2017	2016	2015	2014	2013	2012	2011	2010
Cars	490,412	476,769	359,240	358,861	387,171	391,422	410,959	326,556	310,243	323,587
Commercial vehicles	0	0	10	445	6	12	38	11,209	24,989	27,325
Total	490,412	476,769	359,250	359,306	387,177	391,434	410,997	337,765	335,232	350,912
Growth	2.86%	31.09%	-0.02%	-7.2%	-1.1%	-4.8%	21.7%	0.8%	-4.5%	18.4%

	2009	2008	2007	2006	2005	2004	2003	2002	2001	2000
Cars	279,320	231,056	234,103	201,663	174,538	98,997	75,706	65,266	56,774	64,181
Commercial vehicles	14,252	7,609	11,934	20,644	23,188	19,541	14,190	11,987	13,984	
Total	296,498	245,308	241,712	213,597	194,802	122,185	95,247	79,456	68,761	78,165
Growth	20.9%	1.5%	13.2%	9,6%	59.4%	28.3%	19.9%	15.6%	-12.0%	-26.9%

	1999	1995	1990	1989	1980	1970	1960
Cars	88,313	93,000	94,000	160,000	124,000	59,000	12,000
Commercial vehicles	17,178	18,584					
Total	106,897	93,000	94,000	160,000	124,000	59,000	12,000
Growth							

== Defunct manufacturers ==
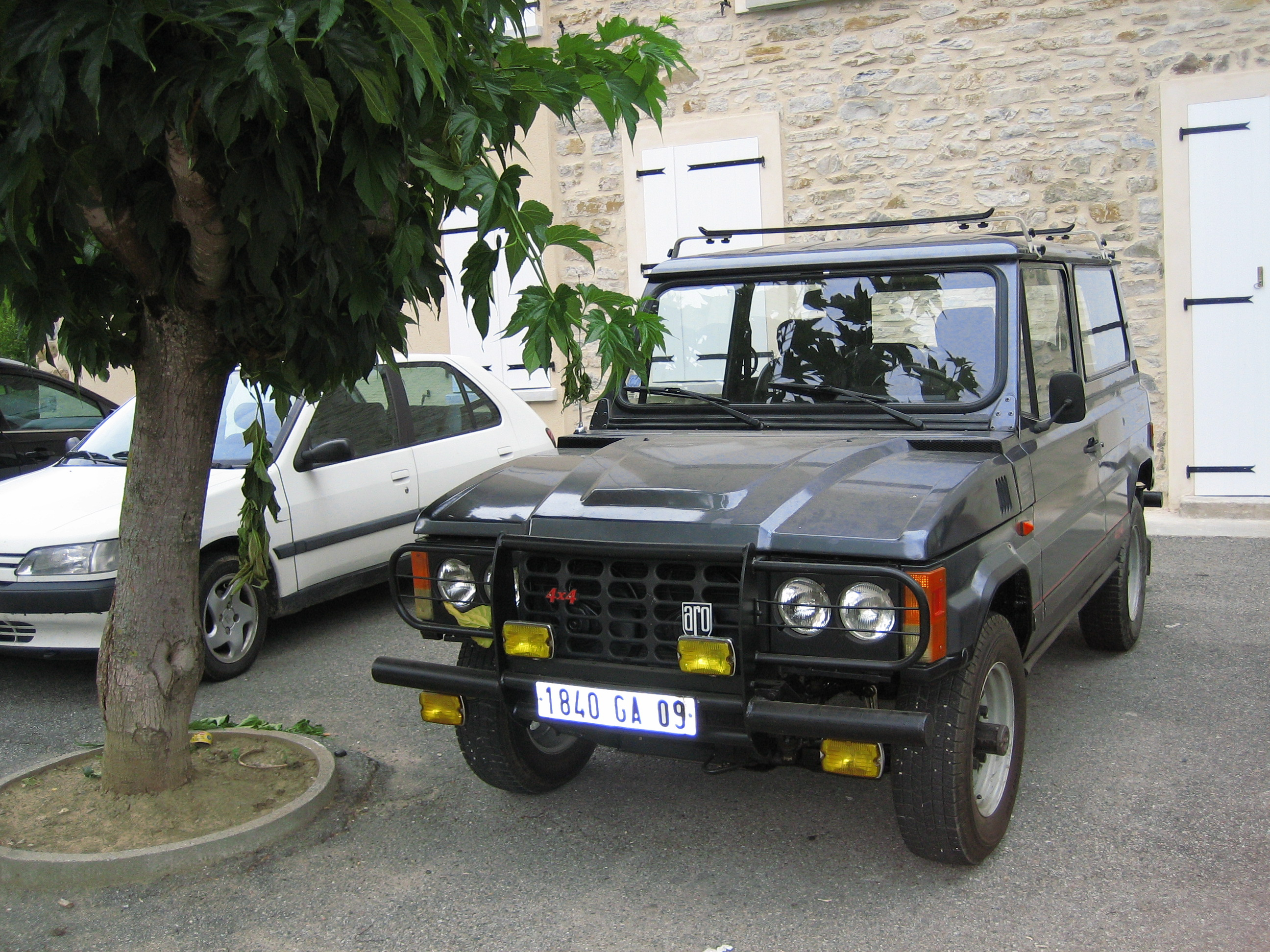
ARO 10 (4x4)

- AA&WF
- ARO
- Automobile Craiova
- Malaxa
- Oltcit
- Rocar
- Rodae
