= Steagul Roșu =

Steagul Roşu (Romanian, 'Red Flag') may refer to:

- Roman (vehicle manufacturer), a truck and bus manufacturer previously named Steagul Roşu
- FC Brașov (1936), a football club previously named Steagul Roşu
