= Nicolae Malaxa =

Romanian businessman (1884 - 1965)

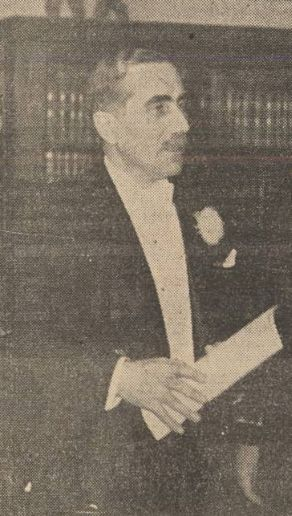
- Born: December 24, 1884; Huși, Kingdom of Romania
- Died: 1965 (aged 80–81); New Jersey, United States
- Education: University of Iași; Polytechnic University
- Occupations: Engineer; Industrialist
- Spouse: Natalia Craescu (m. 1918)
- Children: Irina, Constantin

Nicolae Malaxa (22 December [O.S. 10 December] 1884 – 1965) was a Romanian engineer and industrialist.

== Biography ==
Born in a family of Greek origin in Huși, Malaxa studied engineering in Iași (at the University of Iași) and Karlsruhe (at the Polytechnic University). Late in his life, Petre Pandrea, a Romanian intellectual who was for long a member of the Communist Party and later became a victim of the Communist regime, wrote a memoir which, in part, dealt with Malaxa's biography, recording it with a dose of hostility. In it, he indicated that Malaxa's father died a young man, and that Nicolae was kept in university with money earned by his mother and sister. Pandrea, who called Malaxa "a mama's boy" and argued that this had shaped his character, also noted that, after graduation and contrary to his family's wishes, the engineer married a divorcée (who had been married to one of his early business partners). Malaxa married Nadia Craescu on February 20, 1918; the couple had two children: Irina (born on August 11, 1919), and Constantin (born on April 23, 1922). In time, Pandrea claimed, tensions grew between the two Malaxas, after the "Puritan" Nicolae came to resent his "frivolous" wife.

Malaxa joined the Romanian Railways Company as a constructions engineer. Pandrea implied that this went against procedure, and was the result of Malaxa having befriended Chairman Alexandru Cottescu. The same source indicated that Malaxa continued to engage in business ventures, and that, upon the end of World War I and the Romanian Campaign, he was living in Iași and managing a grape-selling business. In 1918–1919, he quit his job at the Company and started a new business dealing with rolling stock maintenance — the venture was instantly successful, a fact which Pandrea attributed to the infrastructure's decay under the previous occupation by the Central Powers. Thus, Malaxa revitalized rail vehicles left into disrepair, which he sold back to the state at ten times the investment.

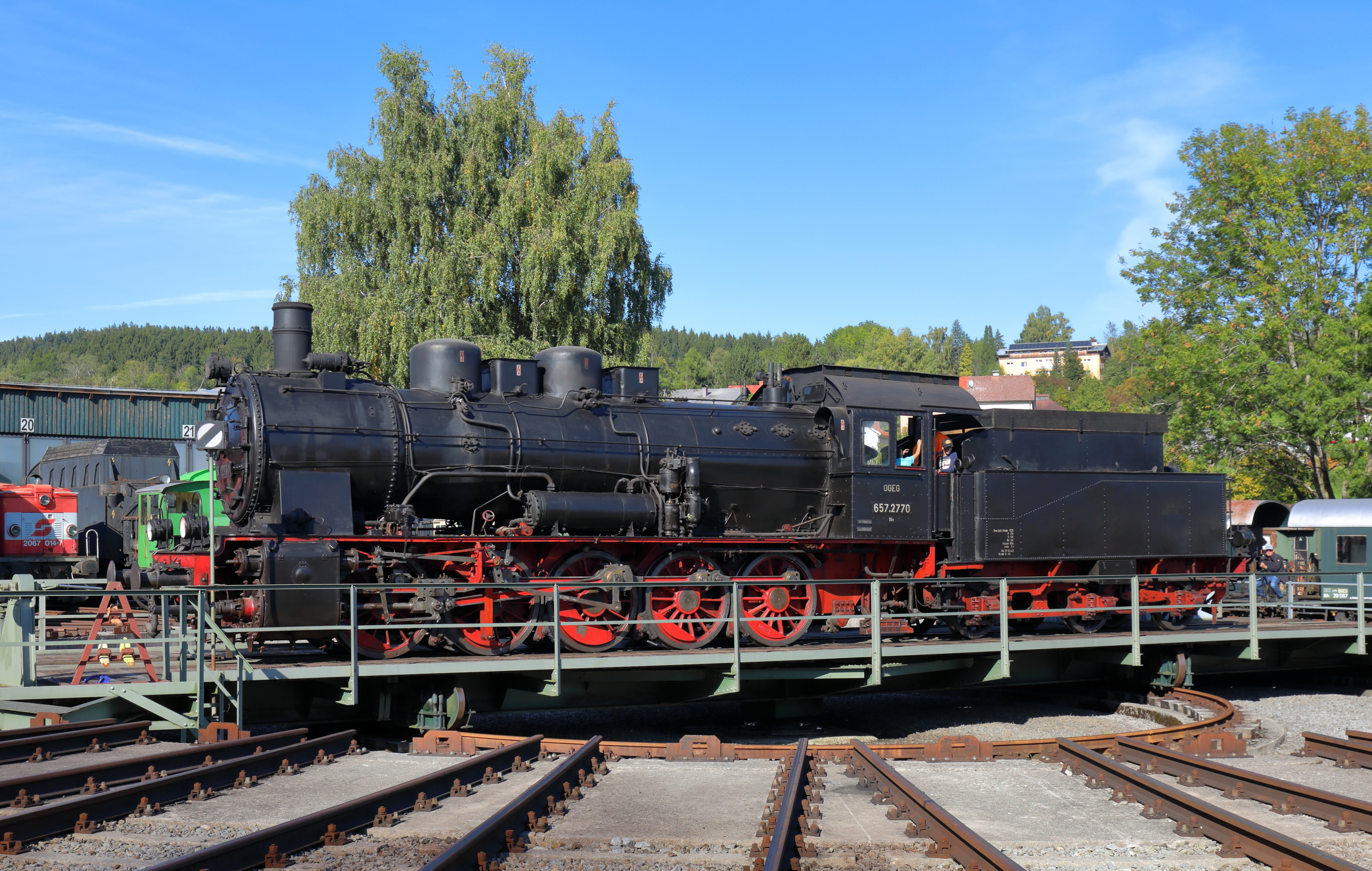
Malaxa Factory steam locomotive with serial number 299

According to Time, Malaxa "parlayed a shoestring into a chain of arms factories and a partnership in Rumania's largest iron works". By the end of the 1930s, the Malaxa factories were mass-producing steam locomotives, diesel locomotives, trainsets, rolling stock, steel pipes, and were one of the biggest industrial groups in Southeastern Europe, and the main provider of equipment for the Romanian Railways during the period. In several of his locomotive designs, Malaxa used innovative solutions (in locomotive design — those developed in by George Constantinescu on the basis of his theory of sonics; in factory design — in collaboration with Horia Creangă). Owning much of Romania's steel industry through his strong presence in Reșița, he was chairman of the Ford Motor Company's Romanian section, and arguably the richest man in Romania at the time.

Malaxa was close to the authoritarian King Carol II. Together with Aristide Blank and Max Auschnitt, he was one of the major businessmen present in the king's camarilla (see National Renaissance Front); such political connections also implied that his success was partly ensured by preferential deals agreed with the state, and in some cases by the placement of inferior products on a captive market. According to Pandrea, Malaxa had made a habit of manipulating state officials into granting him preferential credits, which explained his interest in supporting Carol's moves. Reportedly, Malaxa and his wife were especially close to the king's mistress, Elena Lupescu, and even became related through marriage (after Lupescu's nephew, an engineer, married the niece of Malaxa's wife).

Around 1939, Carol's son Michael was rumored to be in a relationship with Irina (Lulu) Malaxa (Nicolae's daughter). Petre Pandrea also alleged that, soon after turning 17, the virgin Lulu had been raped by Carol on board his Luceafărul yacht — before her father decided to intervene, remove her from the circle of friends, and send her to study in Paris. (Two years later, she married George Emil Palade, the future Nobel Prize in Physiology or Medicine winner.) Pandrea also claimed that this was the origin of the notorious conflict between the engineer and Auschnitt, alleging that the latter's wife, was Carol's third mistress and resented Lulu's apparent success. He also claimed that Elena Lupescu was cheating on the king with his secretary Ernest Urdăreanu, who was also an important figure of the camarilla and who kept close contacts with the Malaxas.

Unlike most other large industries in the country, Malaxa's was not tied to British, French or Czechoslovak interests. Instead, Nicolae Malaxa maintained business links with Nazi Germany as early as 1935. At a time when Nazi Germany was gaining more influence in Romania, Nicolae Malaxa collaborated with Hermann Göring in confiscating the assets of the Jewish Auschnitt (who had been arrested and prosecuted on false charges in September 1939), and subsequently placed his industrial empire in the service of the Reichswerke during World War II.

Just after Carol fell from power in 1940, Malaxa was briefly imprisoned on charges that he had resorted to extortion in previous years. Probably sympathizing with Nazi ideology, he had financed the activities of all political parties, including the Romanian far right Iron Guard organization as early as the mid-1930s, and especially throughout the National Legionary State the latter established. During the Rebellion and Pogrom it provoked in January 1941, the Guard made use of arms manufactured by Malaxa, as well of his house (turned into a citadel and attacked by the Romanian Army) — he was consequently put on trial by Ion Antonescu's government.

In February 1945, several months after the August 1944 coup d'état which toppled Antonescu, and following the start of Soviet occupation, his Bucharest factories were at the center of mysterious and violent events. At the time, independent Premier Nicolae Rădescu had come into conflict with the rising Romanian Communist Party, and his frequent speeches to his supporters were disrupted by organized workers. This occurred in Malaxa's plant, and the incident ended with shots being fired and several people killed. The Communist Party claimed that they had been targeted by the Army, acting on orders from Rădescu, despite the fact that bullets recovered from the bodies were not of the kind used by the military. Aggravated by another of Rădescu's addresses, in which he deemed Communists "foreigners without God or a nation", and under pressure from Andrey Vyshinsky (sent to Bucharest by Joseph Stalin to demand from King Michael the resignation of Rădescu), the crisis ended with the appointment of a new cabinet endorsed by the Communist Party and the Soviet Union and presided by Ploughmen's Front leader Petru Groza.

Malaxa used his opportunity to flee after being sent on an economic mission by King Michael, and settled in New York City, where his family joined him after being expelled by the Groza government. Malaxa and his son Constantin (1922–1999) had their Romanian citizenship revoked in by the Communist regime in 1948. In May of that year, he met with the ousted Nicolae Rădescu, and financed him money to start issuing an anti-communist magazine titled Luceafărul (of which philosopher Mircea Eliade was editor).

Alongside accusations involving his endorsement of the Iron Guard, it was alleged that he had been collaborating with the Romanian Communist Party during his last years in Romania. In a CIA report from January 1953 he was labelled a "financial shark," a "slippery fence rider, who plays both ends against the middle for personal reasons," and "the most perfidious man in Romania." In 1955, while Malaxa was visiting Argentina, the Immigration and Naturalization Service briefly revoked his reentry permit. Both charges were again voiced by Democratic Party politicians during Richard Nixon's 1962 electoral campaign for Governor in California, after focus was placed on the friendship and business connections between Nixon and Malaxa. A government investigation dismissed the accusations, however according to chief of the CIA's Balkan operations Gordon Mason evidence regarding the Nixon-Malaxa connection was ignored by the Nixon supporting Allen Dulles and actively erased by Walter Bedell Smith who demanded all information Mason and Southern European Division chief Herman Horton had on Malaxa with neither possessing duplicates.In 1979, his pro-Nazi past was again investigated by The Washington Post (which claimed that high-ranking American officials close to Malaxa had been involved in a cover-up).

Suspicions regarding Malaxa's alleged communism, dismissed early in the era of McCarthyism by Rădescu, were investigated in 1958 by the United States House Judiciary Subcommittee on Immigration, and centered on rich gifts he had sent to Communist leaders such as Ana Pauker — Malaxa defended himself by arguing that these had been sent in order to ensure his family's safe passage into America.

Having apparently never applied for American citizenship, Malaxa died at his residence in New Jersey.

== Malaxa Factory products ==
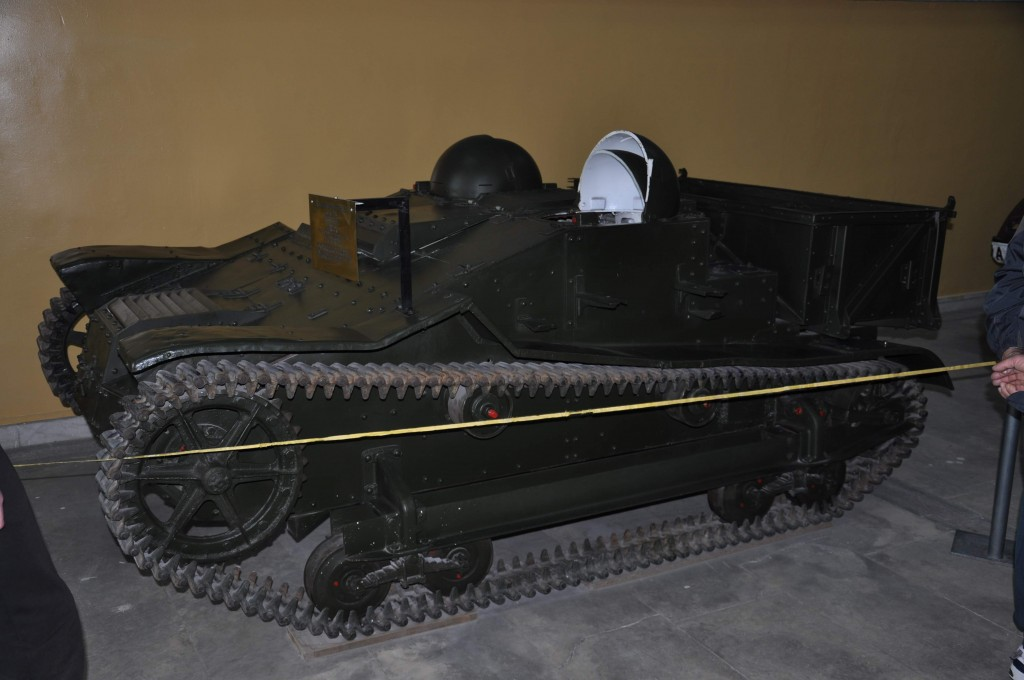
Malaxa produced Renault Chenillette

- Malaxa produced a version of the French Renault Chenillette
- *Malaxa, the car developed at Malaxa's plant

== See also ==
- FAUR, the later name of Malaxa's rolling stock plant
- I.O.R., optics company co-founded by Malaxa
