= I.O.R. =

Optics company in Romania

Întreprinderea Optică Română (IOR)
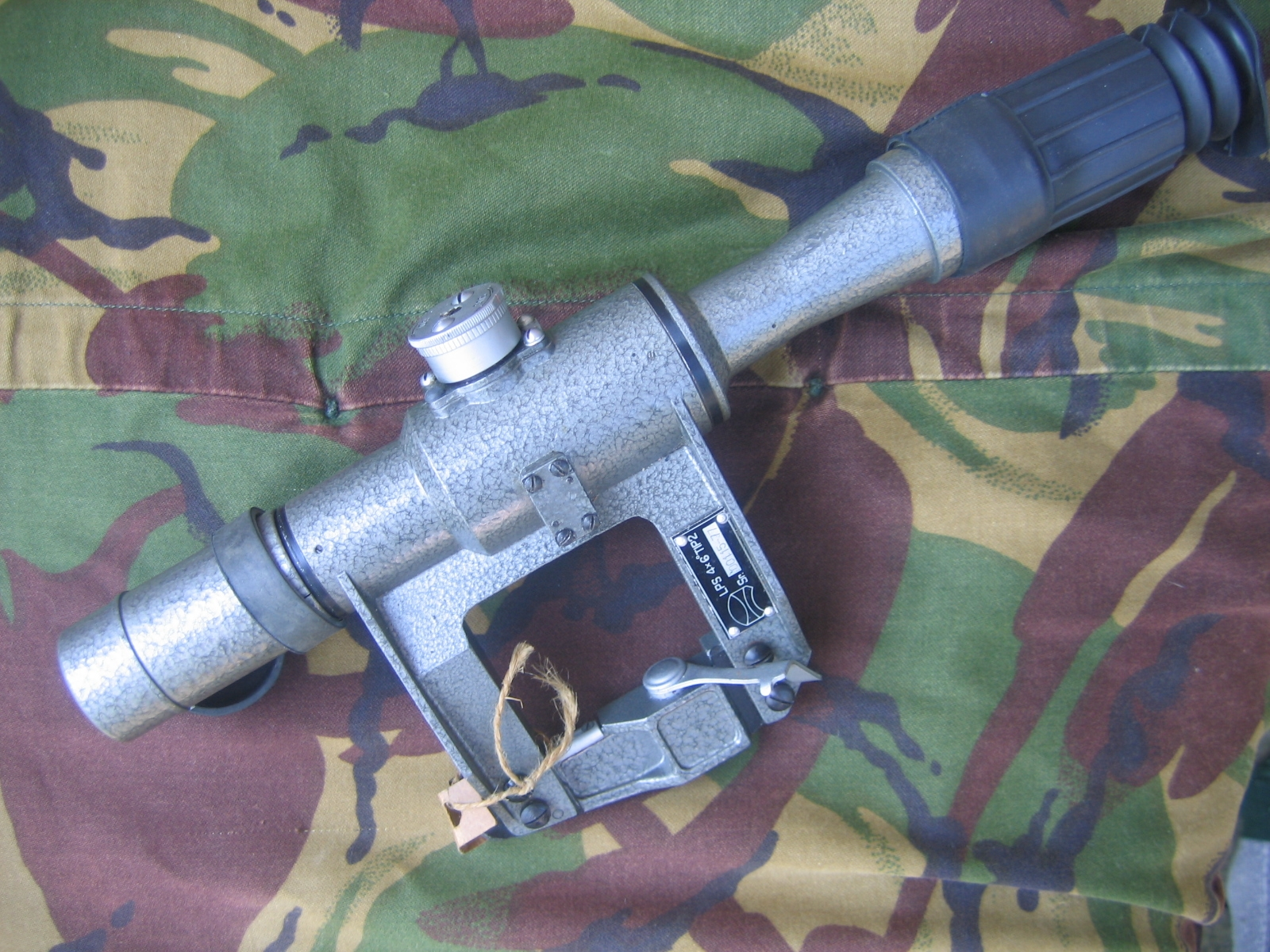
- Romanian PSL rifle scope
- Company type: Societate pe Acțiuni
- Traded as: BVB: IORB
- Industry: Imaging
- Founded: Bucharest, Romania, 1936
- Founder: Nicolae Malaxa and Petre Carp
- Headquarters: Bucharest, Romania
- Key people: Eugen Nicolescu, CEO
- Products: Precision binoculars, spotting scopes, telescopes, night vision equipment, rangefinders, riflescopes, projectors and other optical equipment.
- Revenue: 5.3 million EUR (2007)
- Net income: 1 million EUR (2007)
- Website: www.ior.ro

Întreprinderea Optică Română ("Romanian Optical Enterprise"), often abbreviated by the acronym IOR, is a major optics company established in 1936 in Bucharest. IOR produces military and civilian-grade optics and associated equipment for export and domestic production. The company is known in North America particularly for its riflescopes (the LPS 4x6° TIP2), binoculars and other sporting optics, which often accompany Romanian military equipment sold on the North American market, such as the PSL rifle.

== History ==
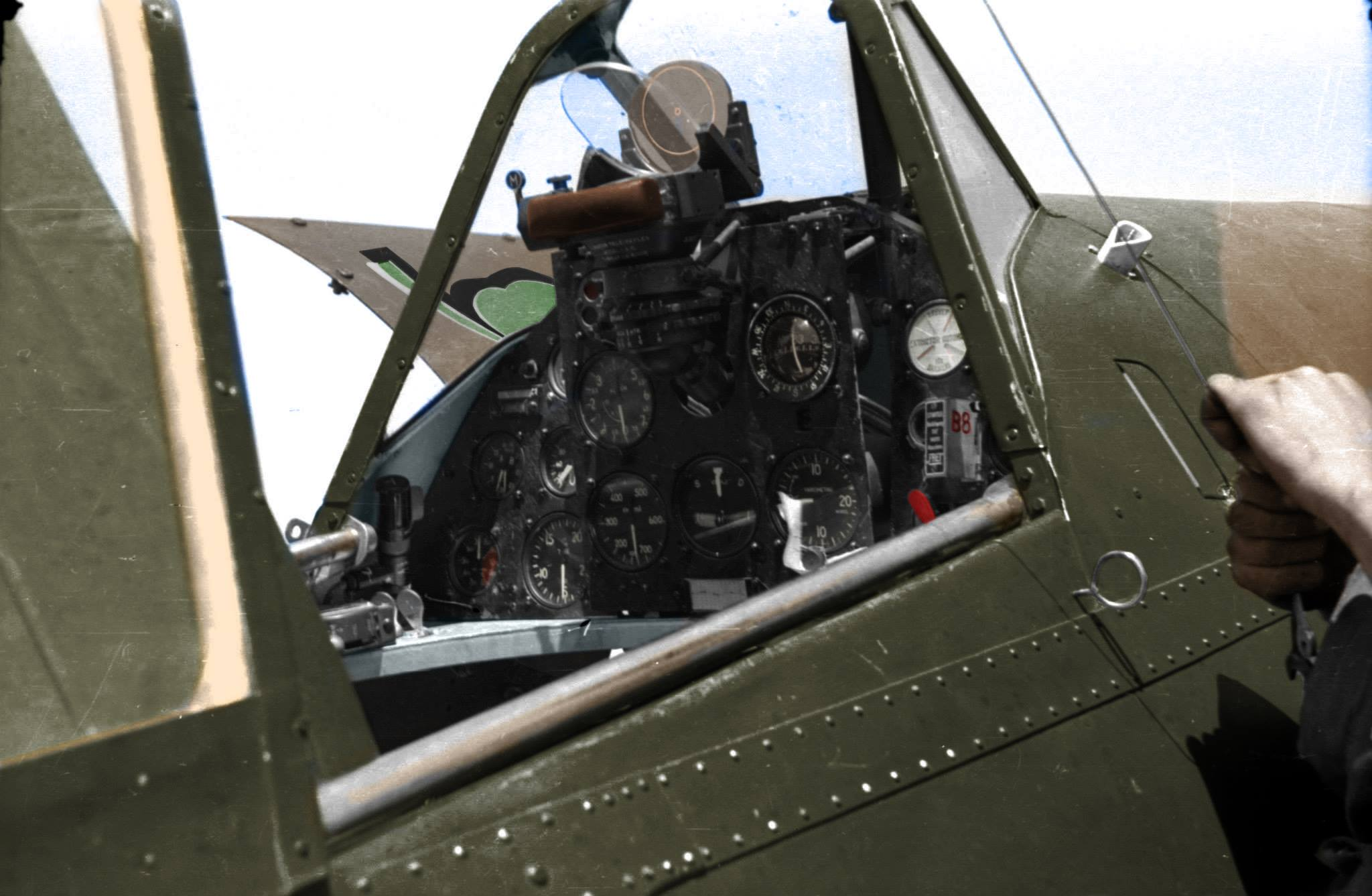
Cockpit of an IAR 80 fighter fitted with a I.O.R. Telereflex reflector sight

The company was established in 1936 as a joint-venture between the Romanian industrialists Nicolae Malaxa and Max Auschnitt, engineer Petre Carp, with participation from the French companies Optique & Précision de Levallois and Bernard-Turnne.

In 1941, when Romania entered the war alongside Nazi Germany, IOR was militarised and was tasked to produce mainly for the Romanian Army. The first military scopes were produced at this moment for what was then the standard Romanian sniper rifle, the Vz. 24. After the war, though the production continued under Soviet domination, the company maintained links to famous Western European firms such as Carl Zeiss AG, Leica, Pentacon and Schneider Kreuznach, which assisted IOR in its modernization and expansion in the 1970s. As a consequence of Romania's refusal to join the invasion of Czechoslovakia, the Soviet Union ceased sharing technical information and exporting military equipment (including the newly designed SVD Dragunov). Accordingly, Romania designed the PSL rifle as a substitute for the SVD Dragunov, and IOR was tasked with developing a scope for the rifle as a replacement for the Russian PSO-1. The result was the LPS 4x6° TIP2 telescopic sight, which became the standard Romanian sniper riflescope.

The company is traded on the Bucharest Stock Exchange.

== Products ==
Since its founding, IOR has produced military (including scopes, binoculars, range finders) and civilian grade optics (microscopes, medical lenses, glass lenses) and associated equipment (still cameras and camera lenses, cinema projectors, dental units). Since the 1980s, the company engaged in optical electronics, lasers, metrology, and thermal vision. The company is SR EN ISO 9001 certified.

IOR optics are currently imported into the US by Valdada Optics and are marketed as "IOR-Valdada".

IOR's LPS 4x6° TIP2 scopes are commonly found on Eastern Bloc sniper rifles such as the Puşca Semiautomată cu Lunetă, and SVD Dragunov. It is also a very common optic on the US commercial market on rifles that feature a compatible side rail mount. IOR was one of the Cold War era manufacturers that survived the transition to a non communist era rather well. This was due in no small part to their close associations with Western European manufacturers and their 1970s modernization. Other manufacturers like the Russian Novosibirsk Instrument Making Plant and Belarusian Zenit company have not been as successful in entering the Western market.

== Rifle Scopes range ==
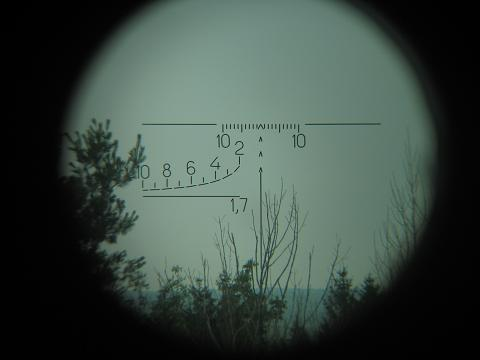
Romanian PSO-1 style reticle

IOR is producing the following models of rifle scopes for the commercial market. The scopes are produced in batches and thus not all of them are always available on the market. Since early 2000s I.O.R. has started to produce very extravagant tactical scopes with technical solutions not often found by other brands. Among such innovations were: 35mm and 40mm main tubes to achieve greater elevation range, 6×, 7×, 8× and 10× magnification and parallax adjustment in the form of a ring on a central tube. Glass lenses used in their products is usually sourced from Schott AG.

=== Hunting rifle scopes ===
- IOR Hunting 1-4x32 IL
- IOR Hunting 10x56 IL
- IOR Hunting 4-14x56 IL
- IOR Hunting 2.5-10x56 IL

=== Tactical rifle scopes ===
Usually all IOR Tactical scopes are in Mil/Mil configuration (adjustment dials and reticle subtensions matched in milliradians) and with first focal plane (FFP) reticle arrangement. Some of the models are however also available with MOA/MOA configuration or second focal plane (SFP) reticles.

- IOR Tactical 4x24 IL
- IOR Tactical 1/6x30 PitBull IL
- IOR 1.5-8x26 Trident IL
- IOR Tactical 1/4x32 PitBull IL
- IOR Tactical 2.5-10x42 IL
- IOR Tactical 2-12x36 SF (.308 BDC reticle)
- IOR Tactical 6-24x56 IL
- IOR Tactical 6-24X50 IL
- IOR Tactical 9-36x44 IL
- IOR Tactical 4-16x50 FFP
- IOR Tactical 9-36x56 IL
- IOR Tactical 3.5-18x50 IL
- IOR Tactical 1-10x26 Eliminator IL SFP
- IOR Tactical 1-10x26 Eliminator IL Dual Focal Plane
- IOR Tactical 3-18x42 IL
- IOR Tactical 4-28x50 IL
- IOR Tactical 2-16x42 DZD IL
- IOR Tactical 12-52x56 Terminator IL
- IOR Tactical 5.8-40x56 Crusader IL (Mil/Mil)
- IOR 3-25x50 Lutaz IL
- IOR Tactical 5-25x56 DZD IL (Mil/Mil)

=== Sport rifle scopes ===
- IOR 36x42 Competition
- IOR 40x45 Competition
