= Grivița (vehicle manufacturer) =

Romanian bus maker

Compania Industrială Griviţa S.A.
- Company type: Joint-stock company
- Industry: Bus manufacturing
- Founded: 1993; 33 years ago 1926 as Atelierele Leonida Bucharest
- Headquarters: Chitila, Ilfov, Romania
- Products: Buses
- Revenue: ▼24,986,575 RON (2008)
- Number of employees: 128 (2009)
- Website: cigrivita.ro

Compania Industrială Griviţa (former Atelierele Leonida and Întreprinderea de Reparații Auto (IRA) Grivița București) is a bus manufacturer based in Chitila, Ilfov county, Romania. The company is also specialized in vehicle servicing and spare parts production. Their main production line is the coach bus called Grivbuz.

== Overview ==
The company started building its own series of buses in 1997 with a midibus prototype.

Their product line includes the:

- Grivbuz 7U midibus built in collaboration with Roman in 2001, and updated in 2003. Such buses have 44 passengers capacity and have been operating in the city of Tulcea.
- Grivbus city bus built in 1999 in three or two doors versions and powered by Renault engine. They have been operating in Cluj-Napoca and Tulcea under public operators and other cities by private owners.
- Grivbuz G07 or Mercedes-Griviţa which is a 7m midibus, based on a Mercedes-Benz Vario chassis with modified body. Has a 27/37 passenger capacity, depending on the version – urban or interurban.
- Grivbuz G12, a 12m coach bus manufactured in two versions – intercity or long-distance coach. They have been developed in collaboration with Roman in 2004. The engines are either MAN EURO 3 – 285 HP or Renault EURO 3 – 265 HP. The Romanian Gendarmerie owns 50 Grivbuz G12 buses.
- Grivbus/Scania city bus built under Scania/Hess licence since 2006 equipped with a 260 HP EURO 3 engine. This type of buses are operating in the city of Târgu Jiu.

== Gallery ==
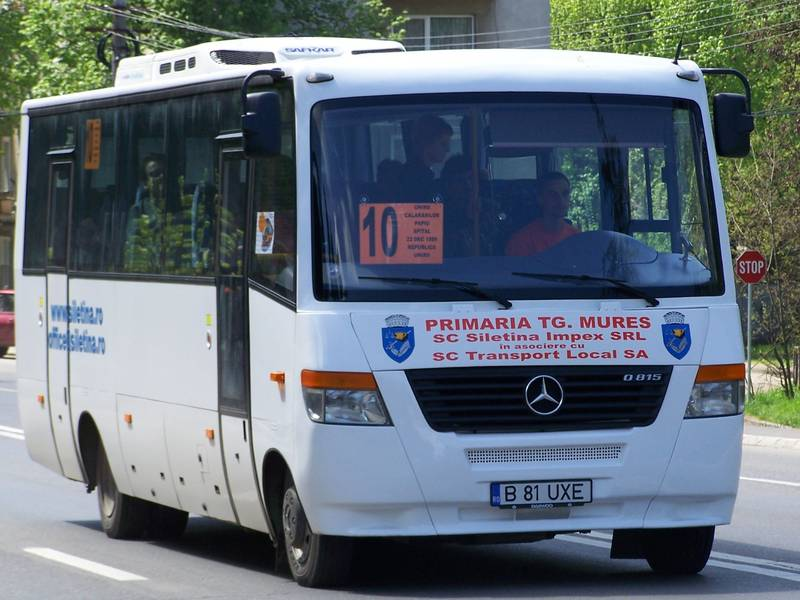
G07 midibus

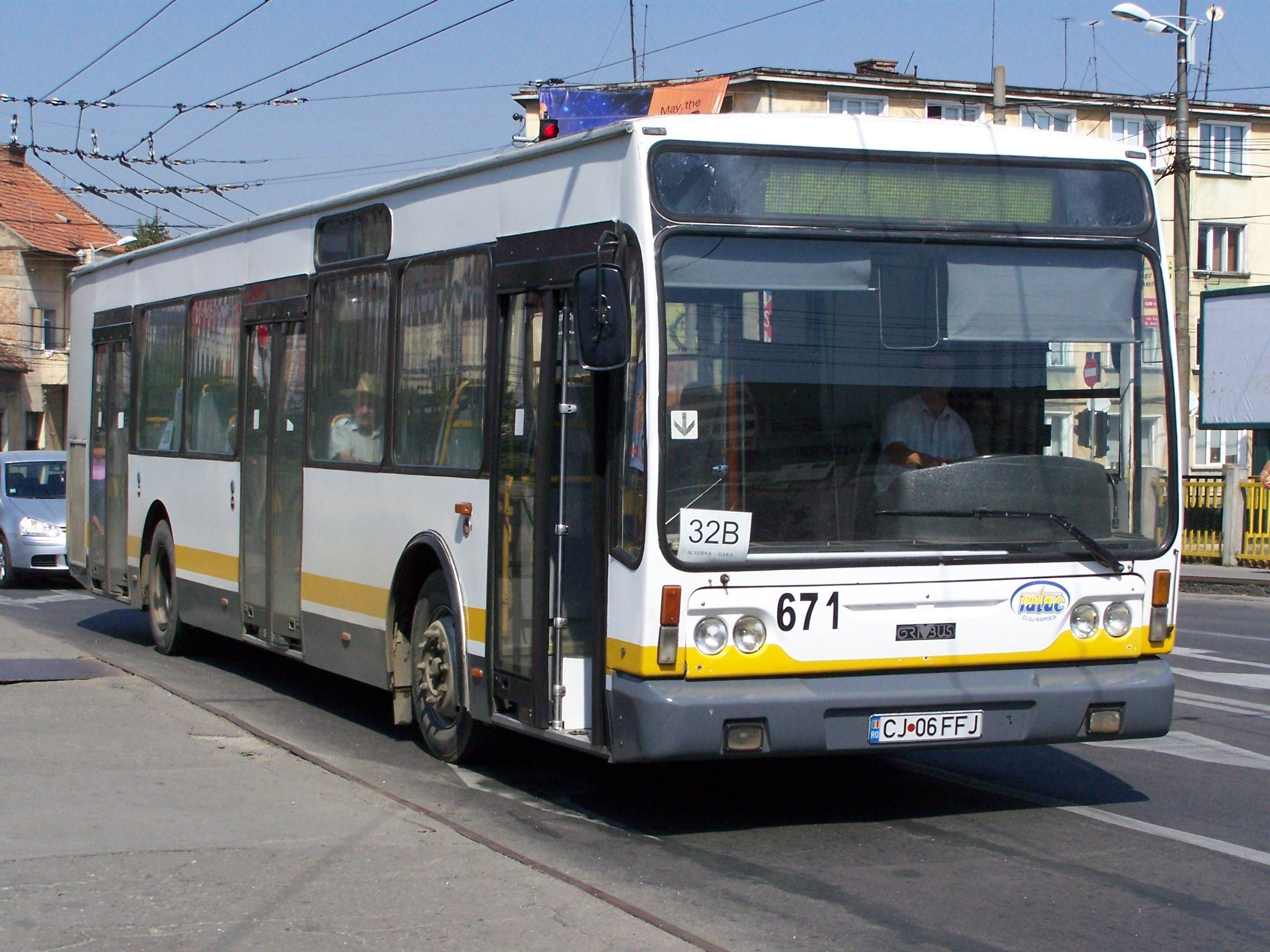
Classic city bus

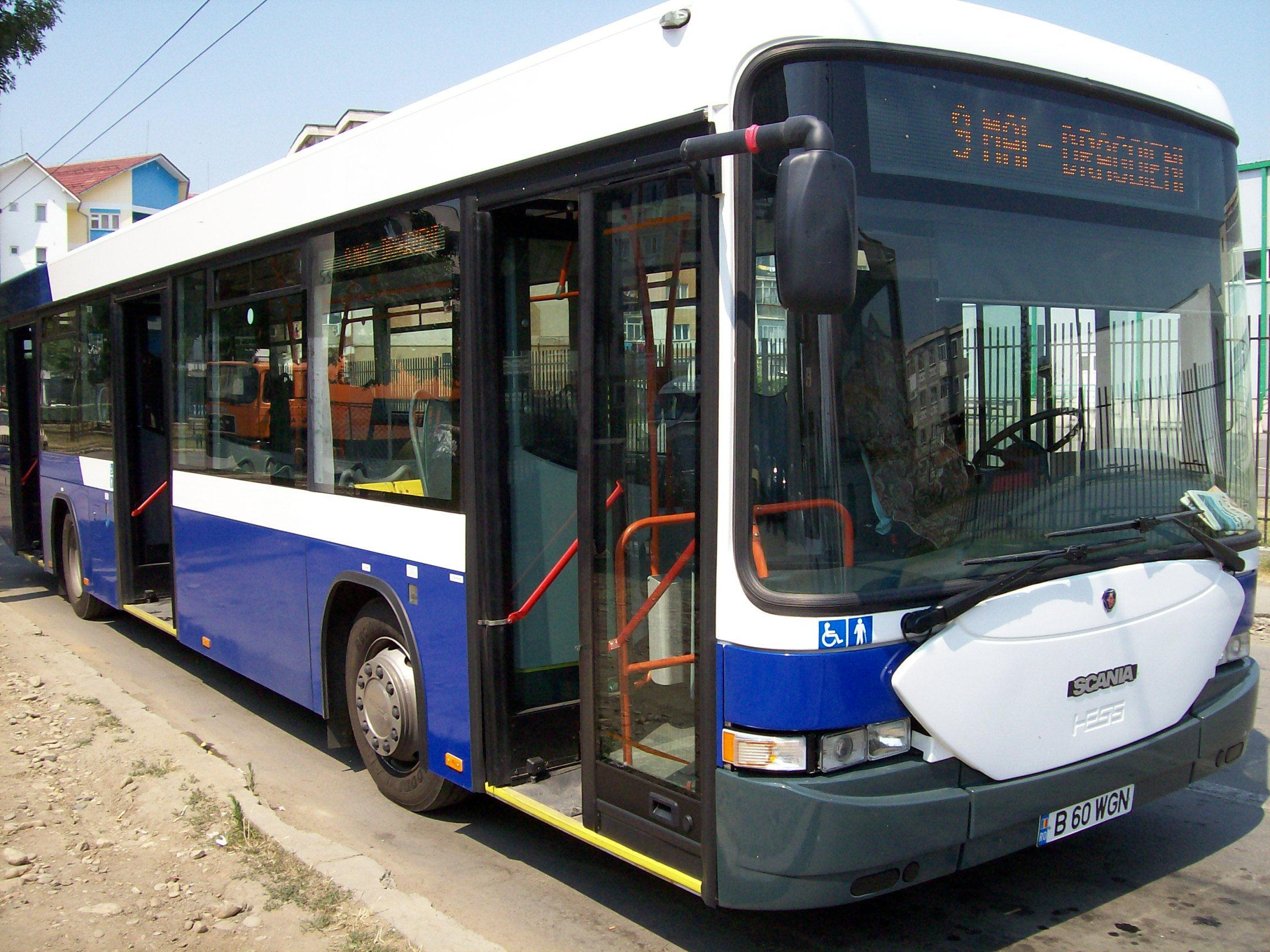
Scania-Hess body
