= C&I Eurotrans XXI =

Romanian coachbuilder

C&I Eurotrans XXI S.R.L.
- Company type: Private
- Industry: Automotive
- Founded: 2002
- Headquarters: Bucharest, Romania
- Products: Minibuses, coachwork
- Website: cibro.ro

C&I Eurotrans XXI is a coachbuilder based in Bucharest, Romania. The company was established in 2002, and it is specialized in manufacturing coachwork for minibuses based on chassis from a series of other manufacturers.

== Cibro ==
The company's main product has been the Cibro minibus, introduced in 2005, and developed on a Mercedes-Benz Vario chassis. It featured a capacity range from 23 to 30 seats and was manufactured in four different levels of comfort.

In 2010, a new version of the minibus, called Cibro 2, was launched. It is manufactured at the new production facility, located in the village of Manolache, Ilfov County. The factory is ISO 9001 certificated and has been implementing ISO 14001 certification.
