= Malaxa (car) =

Overview
- Production: 1945
- Assembly: Romania: Bucharest

The Malaxa was a car designed and built in 1945 in Romania, as the national machine industry had to convert its wartime output to civilian items. This model was designed by a team headed by engineer Petre I. Carp, of "Nicolae Malaxa Studies Society". Few prototypes were built in various aircraft factories in Romania (IAR Brașov, ASAM Cotroceni etc.), with the financial support of Nicolae Malaxa – hence the car's nickname.

The final number of cars produced in Romania is unclear. The production was stopped when the Soviets decided to move the production line in the Soviet Union, allegedly after a high-ranking official from Moscow had a ride with the car in Sofia, Bulgaria.

== Description ==
Malaxa had an air-cooled 3-cylinder 2-strokes rear radial engine, rear wheel drive (RR layout), and was capable of developing 30-35 bhp. The top speed was 105-120 km/h and the gas mileage was 10 L/100 km.

The gearbox had four speeds with auto-blocking special differential and hydraulic gear stick.

The chassis was tubular. Wheels had a dual hydraulic and rubber suspension. The body had a steel tubes skeleton, covered with steel, aluminum and wood panels. It was fixed on the chassis through four "saddles" and had a special vertical stabilizer.

Malaxa offered a high level of comfort, and could carry five persons with four suitcases in all.

== Further developments ==
The producers intended to adapt the model for a small, 1-ton truck and a small 20 bhp two-seated car intended for middle-class families, who would have cost approximately 100000 lei of 1938.

== Bibliography ==
- (in Romanian) Primul automobil românesc in "România aeriană", XX, nr. 1 from January 1946, p. 25.
- (in Romanian) Brebenel A., Vochin D., Din istoria automobilului, 2nd edition, Editura Sport-Turism, București, 1976.
