= El Car =

Bus manufacturer from Romania

El Car Igescu S.N.C.
- Company type: Private
- Industry: Automotive
- Founded: 2003; 23 years ago
- Headquarters: Bucharest, Romania
- Key people: Dorian Igescu
- Products: Buses
- Website: igero.ro

El Car is a bus manufacturer from Romania. The company was created by engineer Dorian Igescu and their main production line is the Igero bus.

== Igero bus ==
Igero is a bus manufactured in multiple versions: as a city or intercity midibus or as the Igero Maxi, which is a 10-meter version designed for urban transport, with a passenger capacity of up to 80 people.

The design of the bus shows strong resemblance to the bigger Roman 17.280 bus, because the Igero bus is the technical platform on what it is based. There was a strong cooperation between the two manufacturers, based mainly on Roman allowing El Car to use their production facilities. There was a plan for building their own factory but its completion had to be delayed. However the collaboration with Roman ended and the production line was moved to the Romprim factory in Bucharest.

Igero midibuses operate public transportation in Braşov, Târgu Mureş and in Covasna County.

The first Igero bus was built by Igescu in his own garage, in 2004, and was successfully franchised in Romania.

The midibus version of the Igero lengths 8.5m and has a seating capacity of either 31 persons in the intercity version or 59 in the city version. They come equipped with MAN EURO 3 turbocharged diesel engines, developing 170 HP. The gearbox is from ZF and the suspensions are pneumatic. Standard features also include ABS/ASR brakes and air conditioning system.

The Maxi version of the bus was launched in 2009 and is an extended 10m version, equipped with MAN EURO 4 engine, 270 HP, and with up to 80 persons capacity. It also has a maximum permissible weight of 16t and ECAS system. In the future versions they plan to use for this bus a MAN EURO 5 engine.
