= Roman (vehicle manufacturer) =

Truck and bus manufacturer from Brașov, Romania

ROMAN S.A.
- Company type: Private
- Industry: Automotive
- Headquarters: Brașov, Romania
- Key people: Ioan Olaru
- Products: Trucks, Buses, Diesel engines
- Operating income: ▼€79.8 million (2017)
- Number of employees: 300 (2017)
- Website: https://www.roman.ro/

ROMAN (with the DAC division) is a truck and bus manufacturer from Brașov, Romania. It was established after World War II on the foundation of the old ROMLOC automotive factory built in 1921. In 1948, the industrial plant was named Steagul Roșu ('Red Flag'), and later Intreprinderea de Autocamioane Brașov ('Brașov Truck Works'). In 1990, it became ROMAN SA. The company has a special truck division, under the DAC brand name.

== History ==
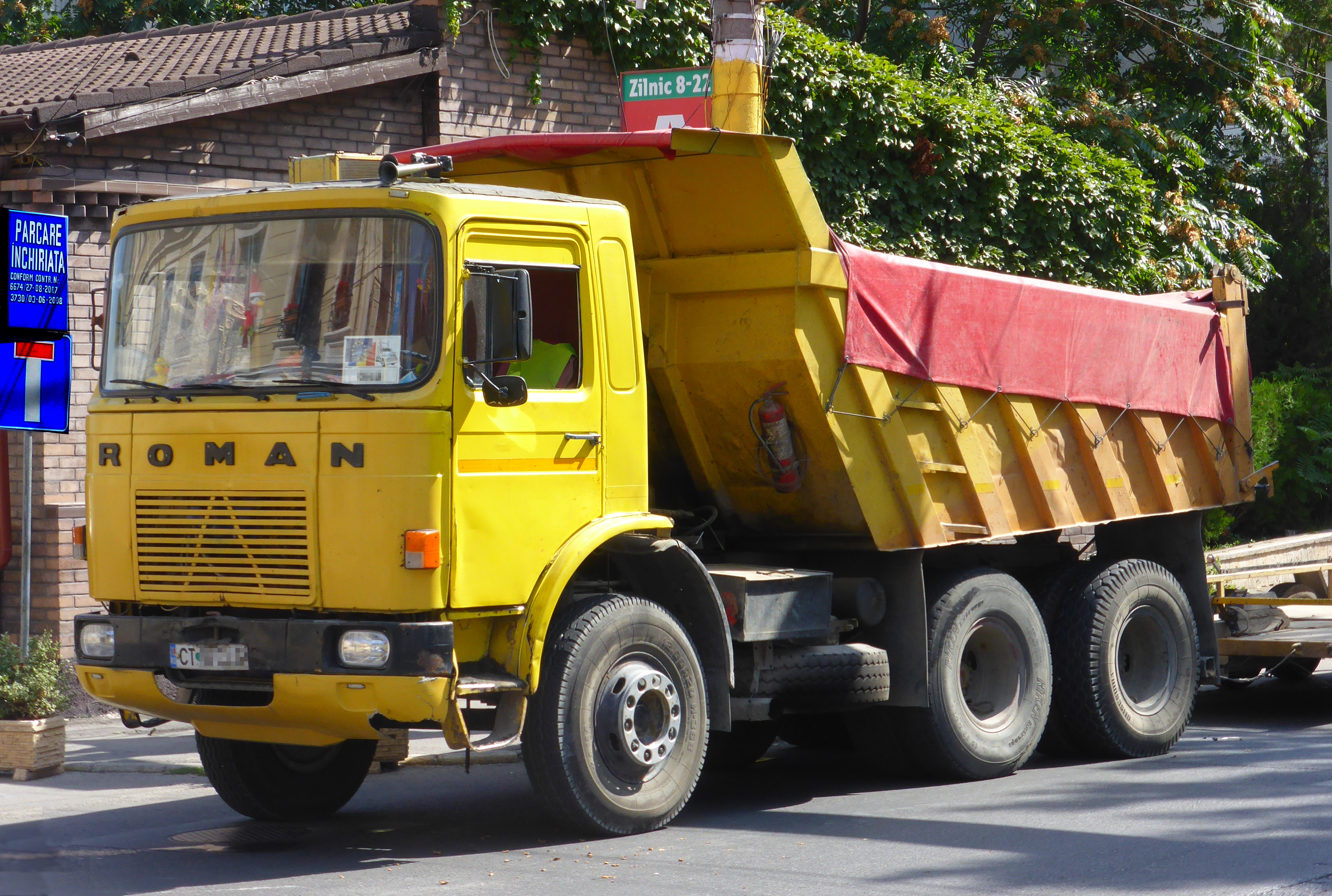
ROMAN truck

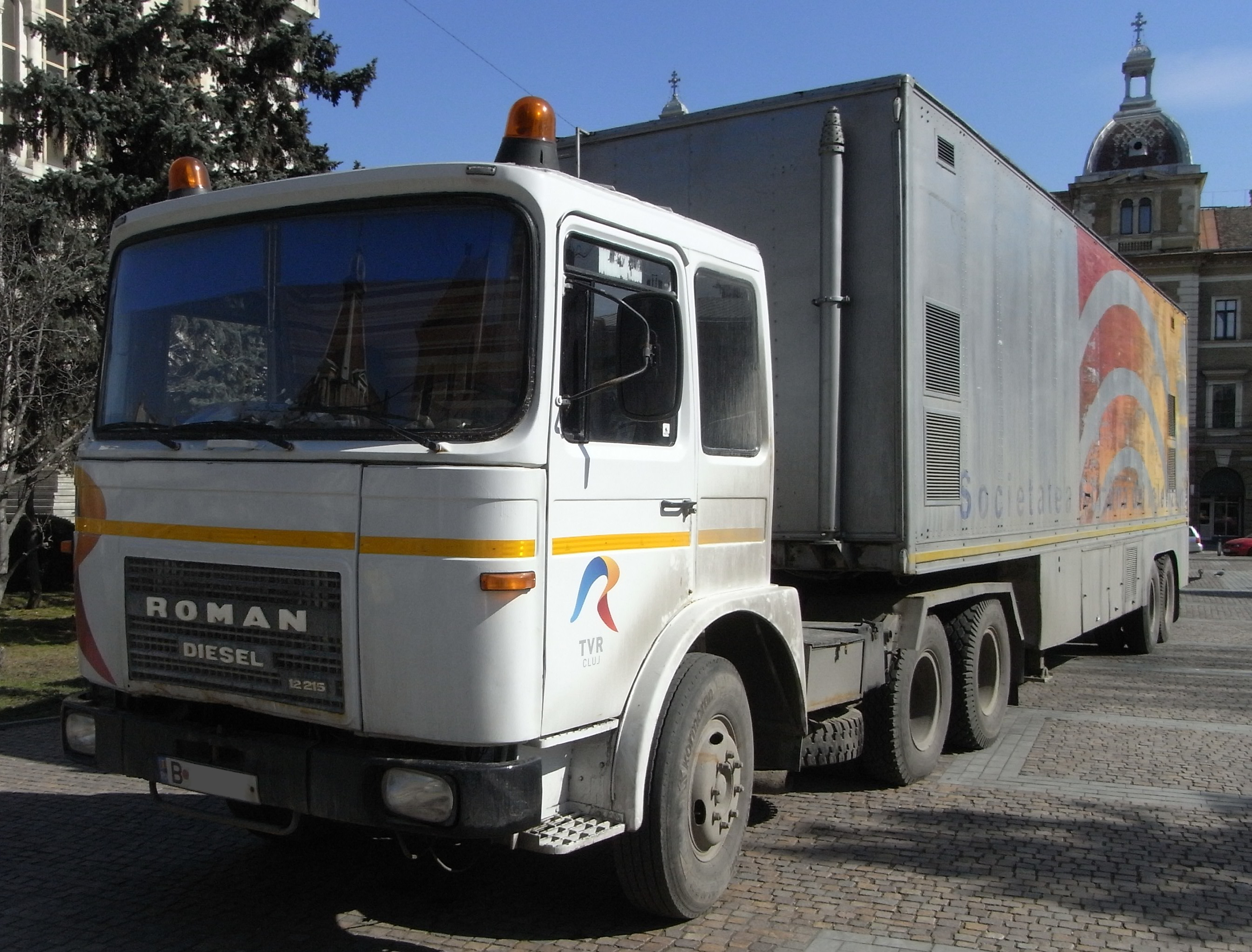
ROMAN trailer-truck

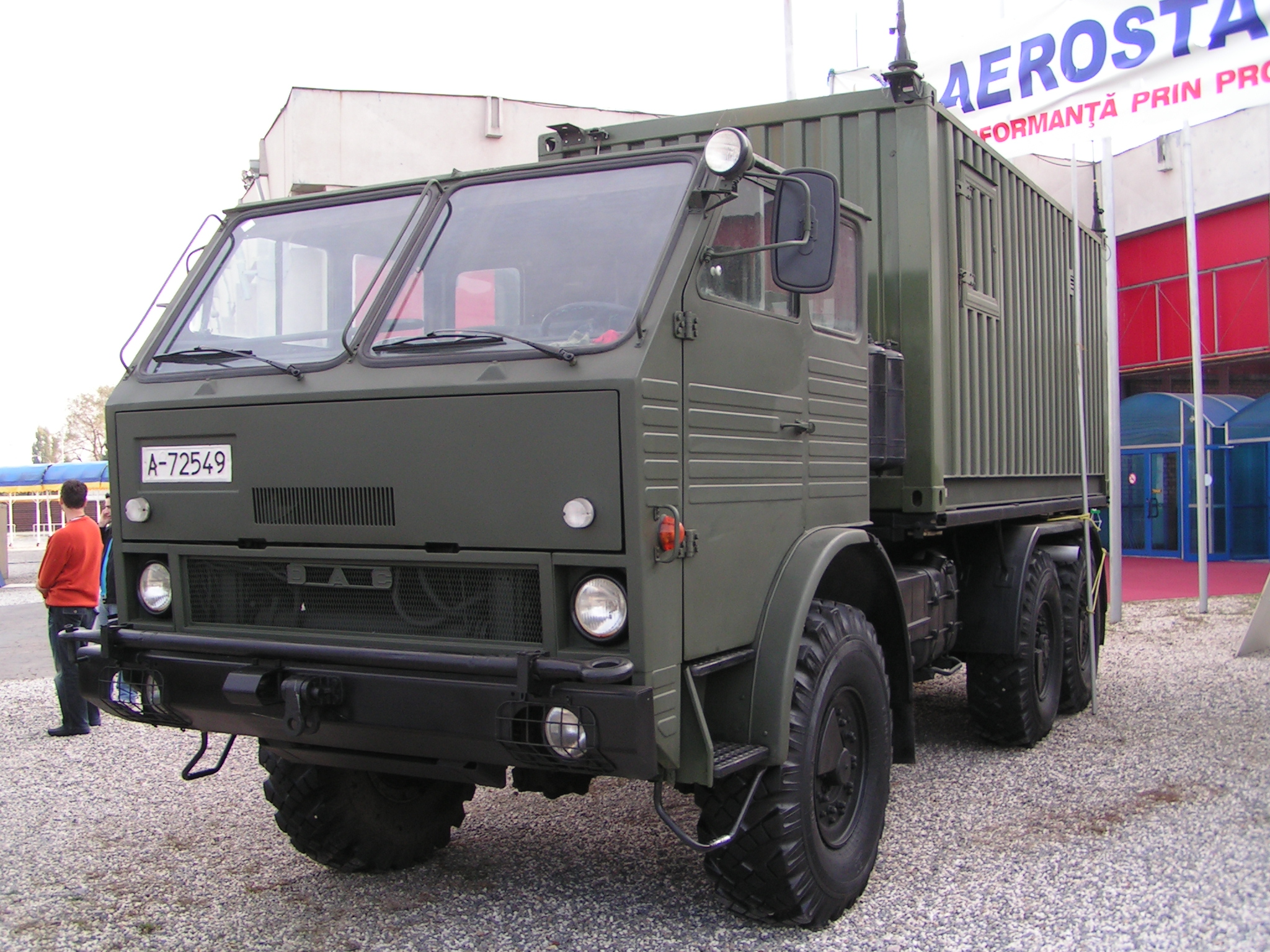
Military DAC truck

The Romanian Locomotive and Wagon Factory (ROMLOC) was established in 1921. In 1936, ROMLOC merged with Astra and became the Astra Works. In 1938, Astra began manufacturing weapons, which fueled company growth, and in 1940 was renamed to the Astra Romanian Wagon, Motor, Armaments, and Munitions Factory, under which name they contributed to the Romanian war effort in World War II.

After WWII and the establishment of the People's Republic, Astra was nationalized, named (in the spirit of the communist days) "The Red Flag" - "Steagul Roșu" (SR), and began to produce trucks.

In 1954, the first batch of SR-101 trucks came out of the factory. The SR-101 was in fact a clone of the ZIS-150 Soviet truck and it came with the same specifications.

In 1958, the company decided to produce a new type, as the SR-101 no longer complied with international vehicle standards. The new design used a Ford Y-block pattern V8 gasoline engine of 140 HP, and its cab has been designed at the Chausson Plant in France. The first V8 SR-131 truck of 3-ton load named Carpati was produced in the summer of 1960, and from 1962 the SR-132 model of 2.5 tons load and 4x4 transmission. In 1964 it started the production of the series named Bucegi, SR-113 a truck of 5-ton load and SR-114 of 4-ton load and 4×4 transmission. Generally, these trucks included all the western technology elements of the time. The range had been completed in five years by the following versions: military vehicle, long vehicle, tip-lorry, crane, forward cab. Torpedo, Perkins, Saviem and Mercedes-Benz diesel engines were used for export products.

In 1967, as Carpati and Bucegi types became old fashioned, a tender was launched for a new type featuring the following specifications: load capacity of 12-18 tons, diesel engine, a forward cab, observance of CEE-ONU standards. Büssing, Mercedes-Benz, MAN, Saviem and Unic came to make offers, and the decision was to sign a contract with the MAN of West Germany. This contract led to the construction, under licence, of two types of ROMAN trucks: medium 135 hp (101 kW) and heavy 215 hp (160 kW), with a load capacity of up to 36 tons. They use the same cabin as the German MAN F7. It also led to the production (at the Autobuzul Works, in Bucharest) of eight types of buses: the town, suburban, intercity and tourism versions.

In the 1970s, the company began to produce trucks under the DAC brand, which shared the same construction platforms with the Roman trucks but it was not part of the 1971 joint-venture between the German company MAN and the Romanian government. Since 1990, DAC has been the special truck division of Roman trucks company.

In 1976, the Romanian's National Institute for Thermic Engines (INMT) produced the new V8 360 hp (268 kW) engine in cooperation with the Austrian company AVL.

After 1989, the Brașov plant started updating the cabin and using Caterpillar diesel engines. In 1999, Roman trucks took 2nd and 3rd places in Rallye of Tunis.

Until 2000, ROMAN produced 750,000 trucks, of which 130,000 were exported in 31 countries.

Since 2002, the heavy truck range has had a new reshaped cabin, called Millennium. As of December 2005, Roman produced military truck equipment for Iraqi military forces. In 2005, Roman also unveiled its new line of buses, with urban and inter-city versions. They were briefly produced with help from Romanian engineer and businessman Dorian Igescu, founder of El Car. The main football club in the city of Brașov, which shares its history with the trucks manufacturer, used a ROMAN 17.360 coach.

In May 2014, the company was taken over by the Pro Roman Association (led by businessman Ioan Olaru) from Prescon Braşov (led by Ioan Neculaie). In August 2014, Roman became insolvent. The truck producing arm of the factory was mothballed as of 2016, with small numbers of trucks and specialty vehicles.

At the beginning of 2017 a contract worth 12 million euro was signed to produce 100 vehicles and ship them to Taiwan.

== Gallery ==
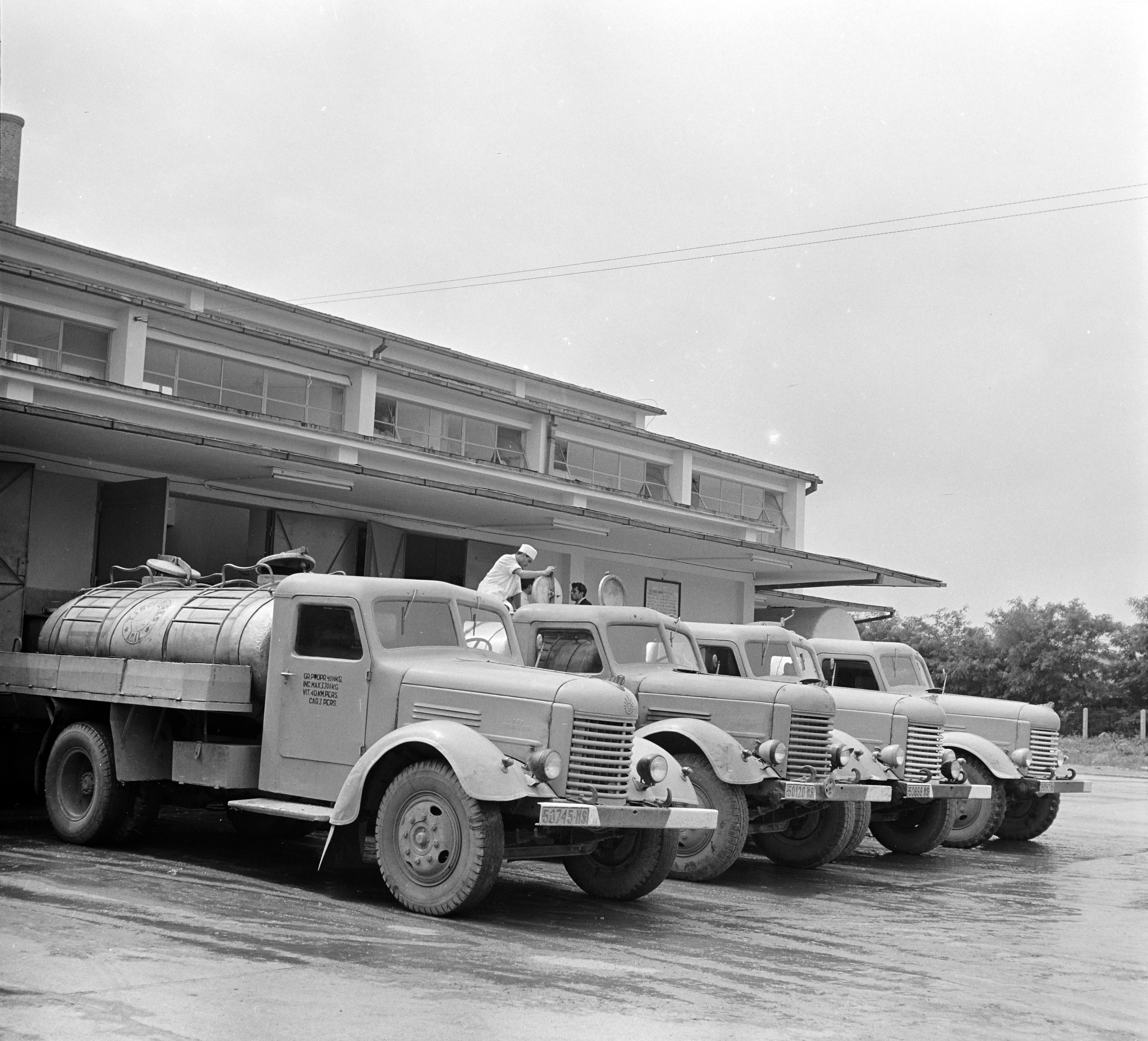
Steagul Roșu SR-101

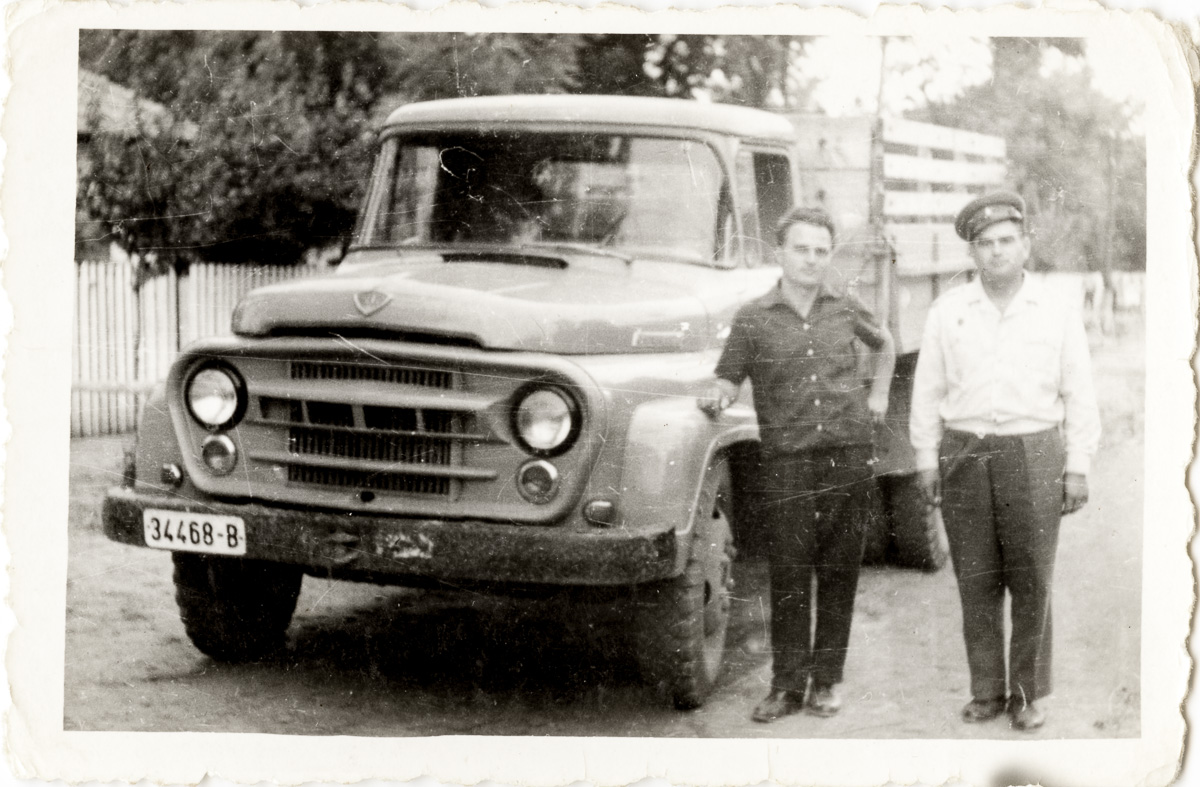
SR-131 Carpați truck

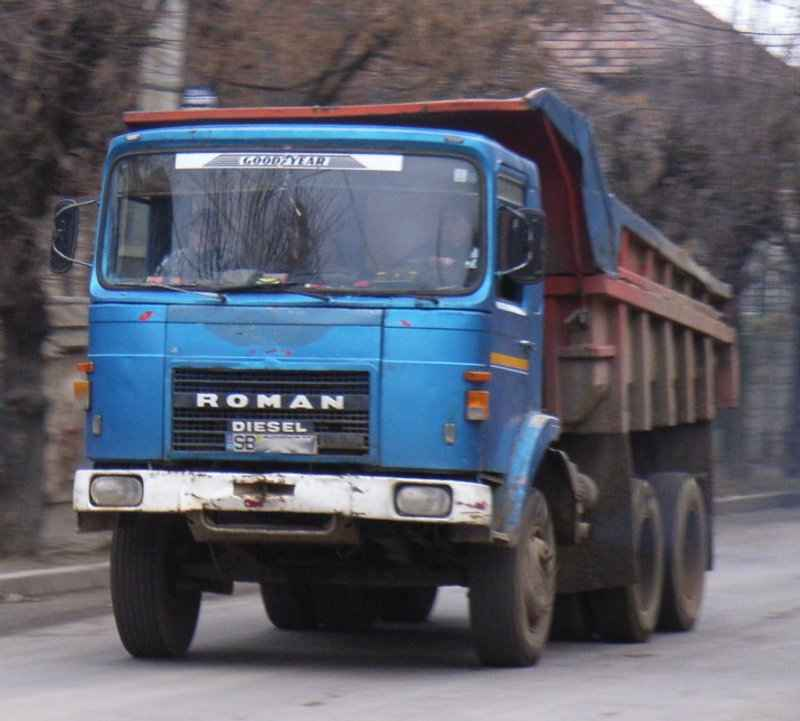
ROMAN tipper truck

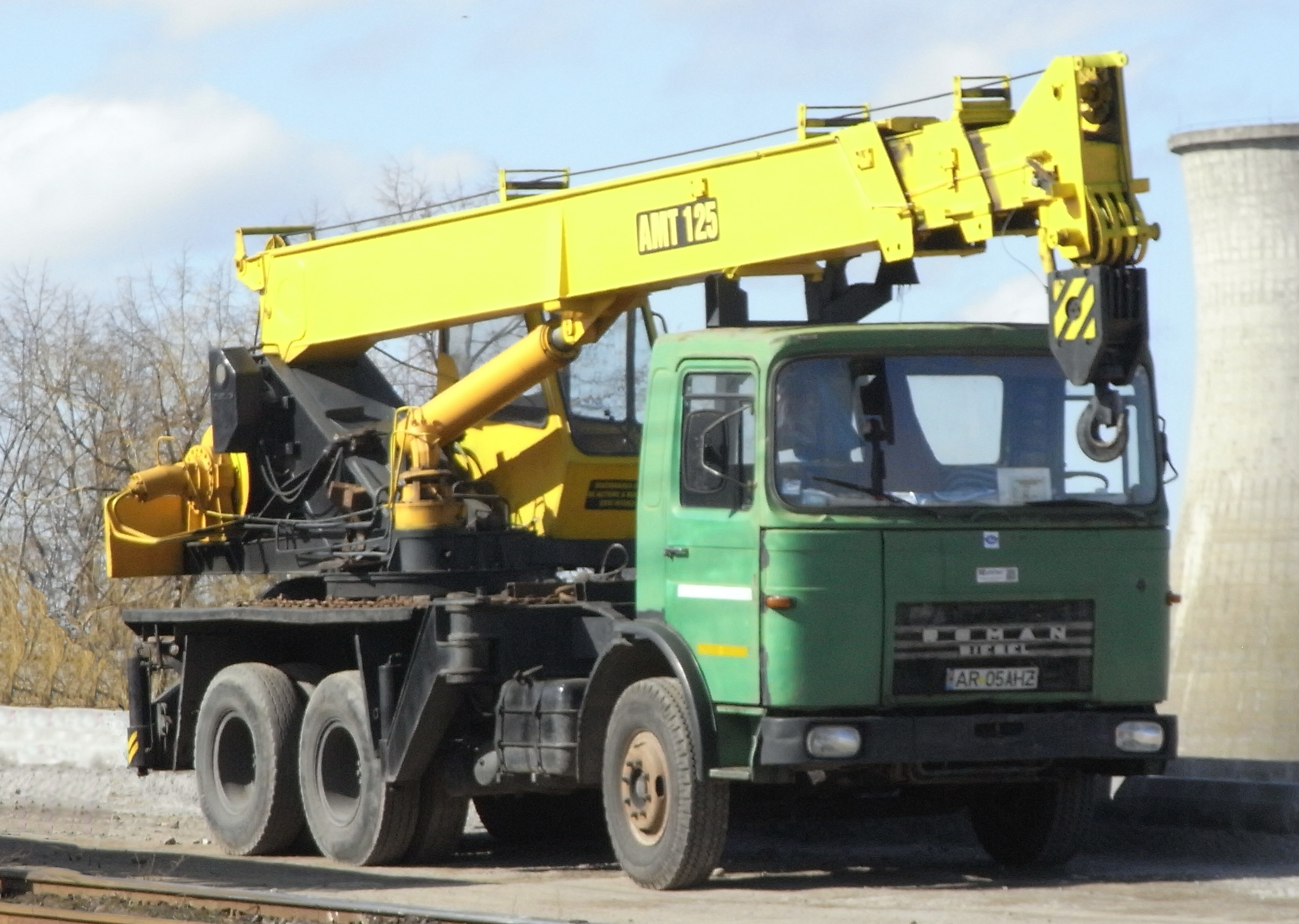
ROMAN crane truck

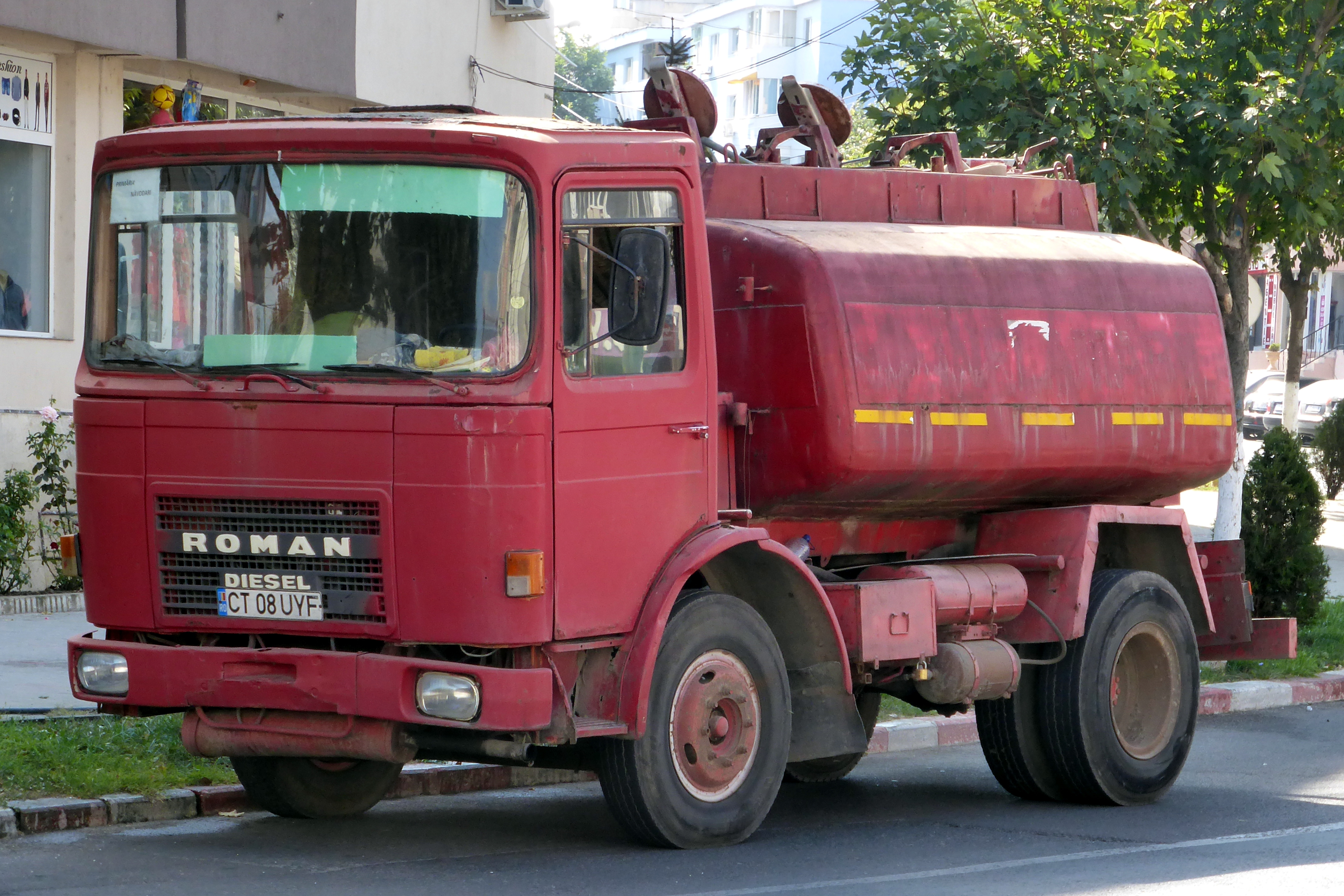
ROMAN tank truck

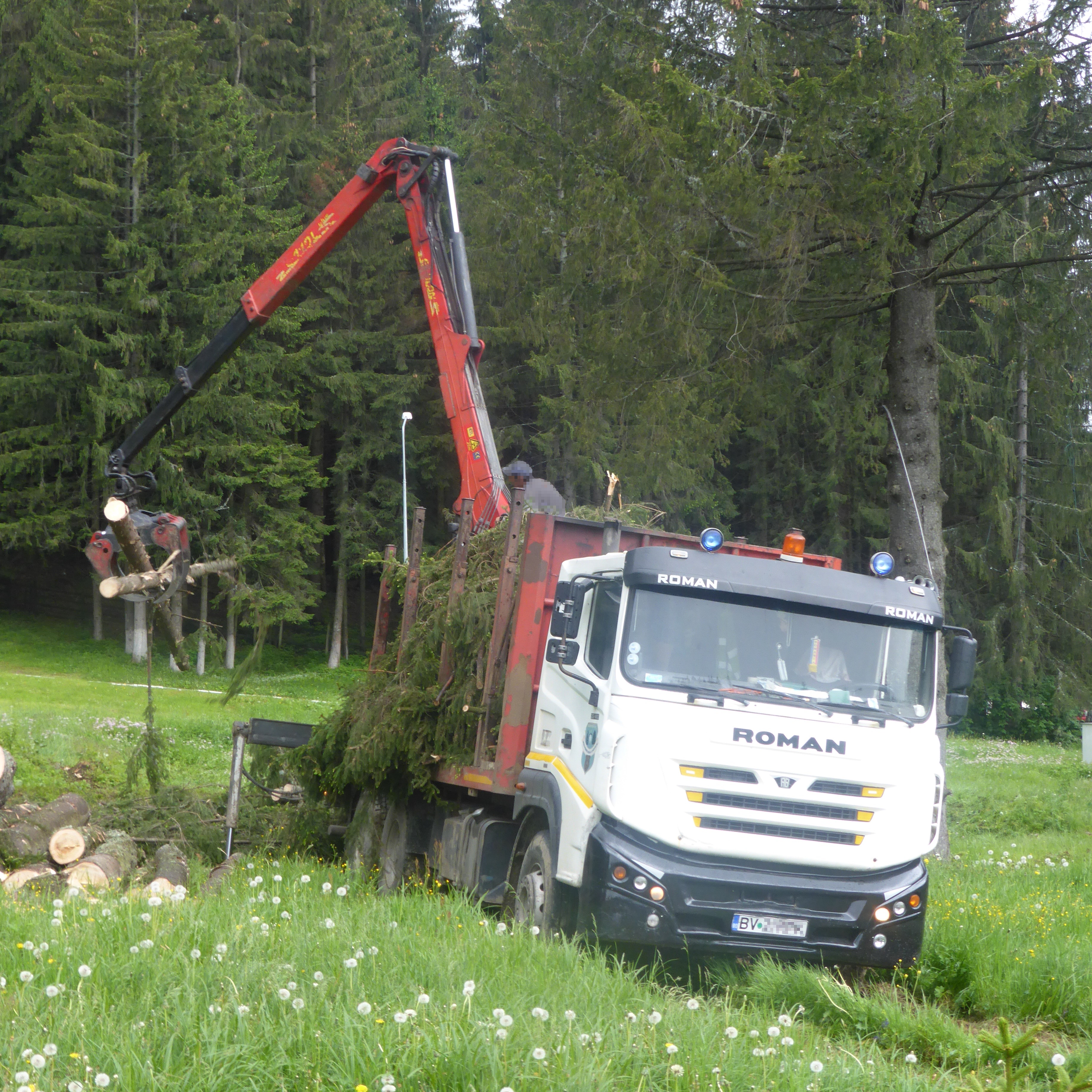
ROMAN logs loader truck

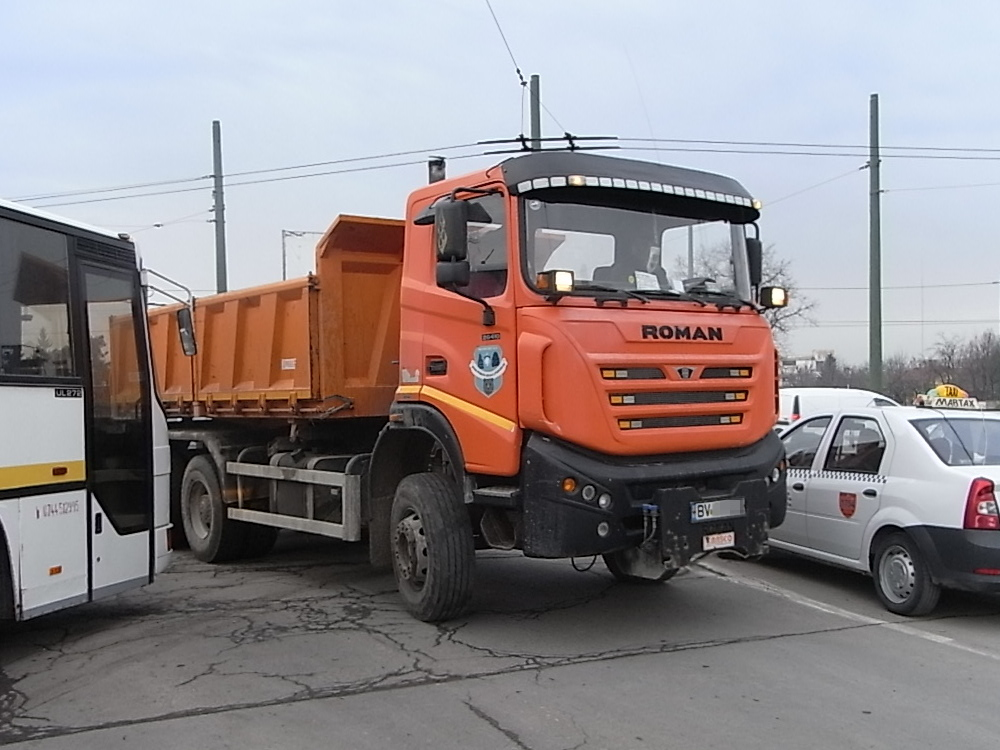
ROMAN truck in 2013
