= Citroën DS =

Executive car produced by Citroën

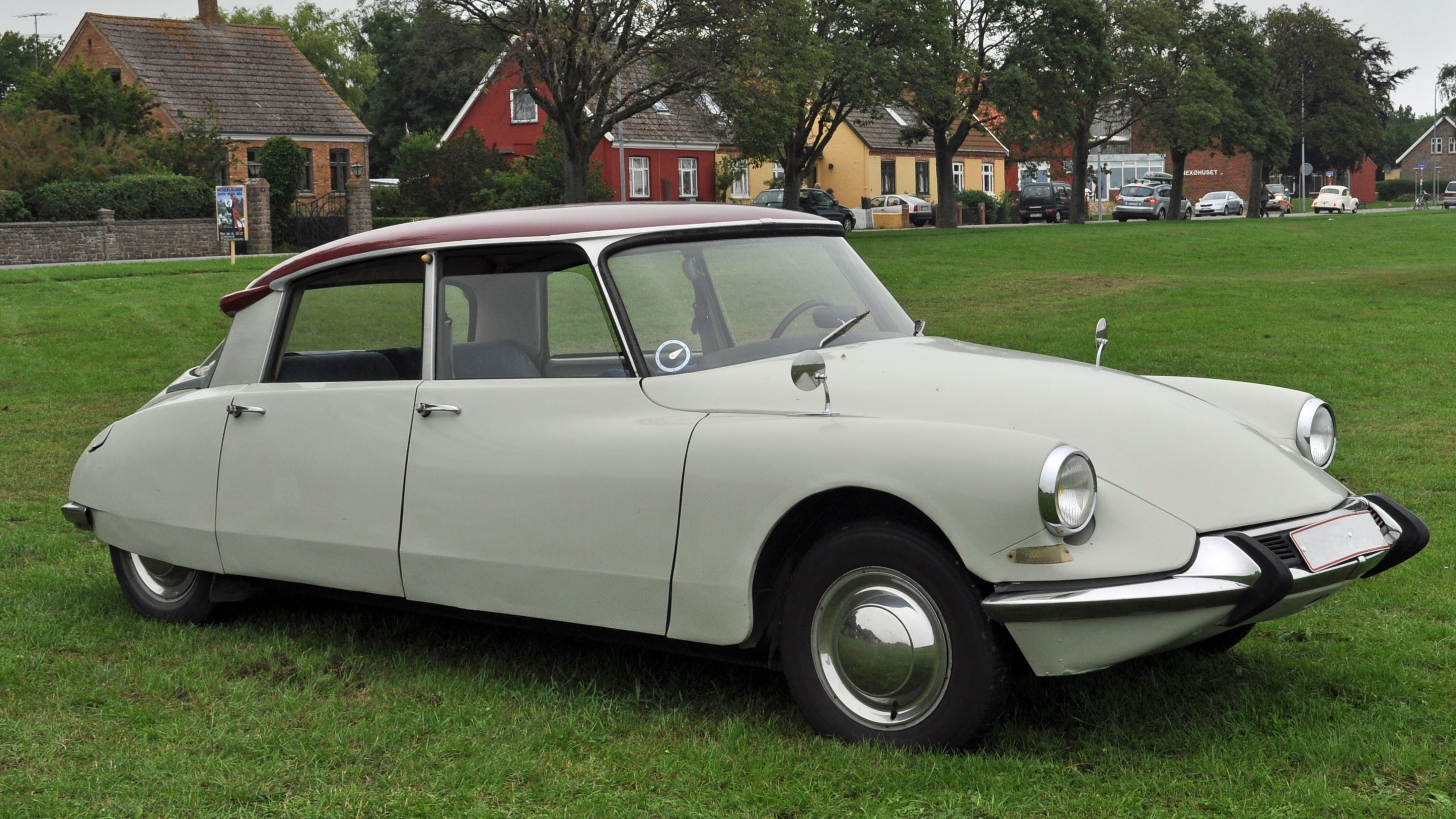

Overview
- Manufacturer: Citroën
- Also called: Citroën DS 19 / DS 21 / DS 23; Citroën D Special; Citroën D Super; Citroën ID 19 / ID 21; Citroën DW (UK, 1962–1965)
- Production: 1955–1975; 1,455,746 produced (Note: 1,330,755 built in France, 124,991 built in Australia, Portugal, UK, South Africa and Yugoslavia collectively.)
- Assembly: France: Paris (Vaugirard); Australia: Heidelberg, Victoria; Portugal: Mangualde (Mangualde Plant); United Kingdom: Slough, England; South Africa: Johannesburg; Yugoslavia: Koper, Slovenia (Cimos)
- Designer: Flaminio Bertoni; André Lefèbvre; Robert Opron (1967 facelift)

Body and chassis
- Class: Executive car (E)
- Body style: 4-door saloon; 5-door estate (Safari); 2-door convertible
- Layout: MF layout
- Related: Citroën SM

Powertrain
- Engine: 1911 cc I4 (DS/ID 19); 1985 cc I4 (DS 20); 2175 cc I4 (DS 21); 2347 cc I4 (DS 23)
- Transmission: 3-speed automatic 4-speed manual 5-speed manual 4-speed semi-automatic

Dimensions
- Wheelbase: 3,124 mm (123.0 in)
- Length: 4,826 mm (190.0 in) (saloon); 4,991 mm (196.5 in) (estate)
- Width: 1,791 mm (70.5 in)
- Height: 1,464 mm (57.6 in) (saloon); 1,537 mm (60.5 in) (estate)
- Curb weight: 1,270 kg (2,800 lb) (saloon); 1,384 kg (3,051 lb) (estate)

Chronology
- Predecessor: Citroën Traction Avant
- Successor: Citroën CX

The Citroën DS (French pronunciation: [si.tʁɔ.ɛn de.ɛs]) is a front mid-engined, front-wheel drive executive car manufactured and marketed by Citroën from 1955 to 1975, in fastback/sedan, wagon/estate, and convertible body configurations, across a single generation comprising three series.

Marketed with a less expensive variant, the Citroën ID, the DS was known for its aerodynamic, futuristic body design and unorthodox, quirky, and innovative technology. It set new standards in ride quality, handling, and braking, thanks to being the first mass production car equipped with both hydropneumatic suspension as well as disc brakes. The 1967 Series 3 also introduced directional headlights to automotive mass-production. (Note: The 1948 Tucker 'Torpedo' was first production car to use directional headlights; 50 were built. The Czech Tatra 603 produced from 1956 to 1962 had a directional central headlight.)

The Italian sculptor and industrial designer Flaminio Bertoni and the French aeronautical engineer André Lefèbvre styled and engineered the DS, and Paul Magès developed the hydropneumatic self-levelling suspension. Robert Opron designed the 1967 Series 3 facelift. Citroën built 1455746 examples in six countries, of which 1330755 were manufactured at Citroën's main Paris Quai de Javel (now Quai André-Citroën) production plant.

The DS was used competitively in rally racing during almost its entire 20‑year production run, and achieved multiple major victories, as early as 1959, and as late as 1974. It was named the most beautiful car of all time by Classic & Sports Car magazine.

The name DS and ID are puns in the French language. "DS" is pronounced exactly like déesse, lit. 'goddess', whereas "ID" is pronounced as idée ('idea').

== Model history ==
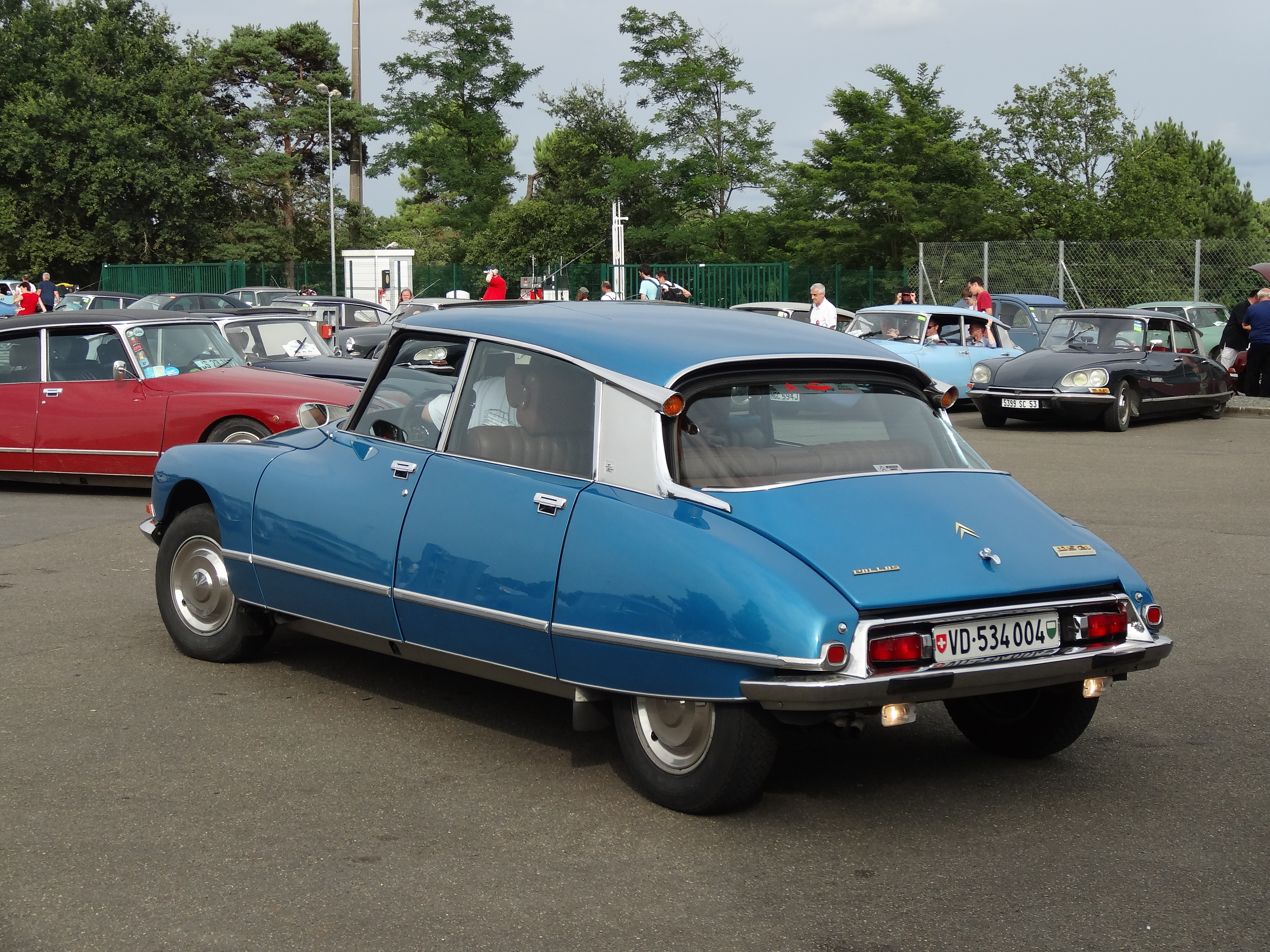
Turn indicators were mounted in the upper corners of the rear window, tail and brake lights integrated in chromed rear bumper.

After 18 years of secret development as the successor to the Traction Avant, the DS 19 was introduced on 6 October 1955, at the Paris Motor Show. In the first 15 minutes of the show, 743 orders were taken, and orders for the first day totalled 12,000. During the 10 days of the show, the DS took in 80,000 deposits; a record that stood for over 60 years, until it was eclipsed by the Tesla Model 3 which received 180,000 first day deposits in March 2016. The original list price for a 1959 ID19 was US$2,833 ($31,289 in 2025 dollars).

Contemporary journalists said the DS pushed the envelope in the ride vs. handling compromise possible in a motor vehicle.

The DS was distributed to many territories throughout the world.

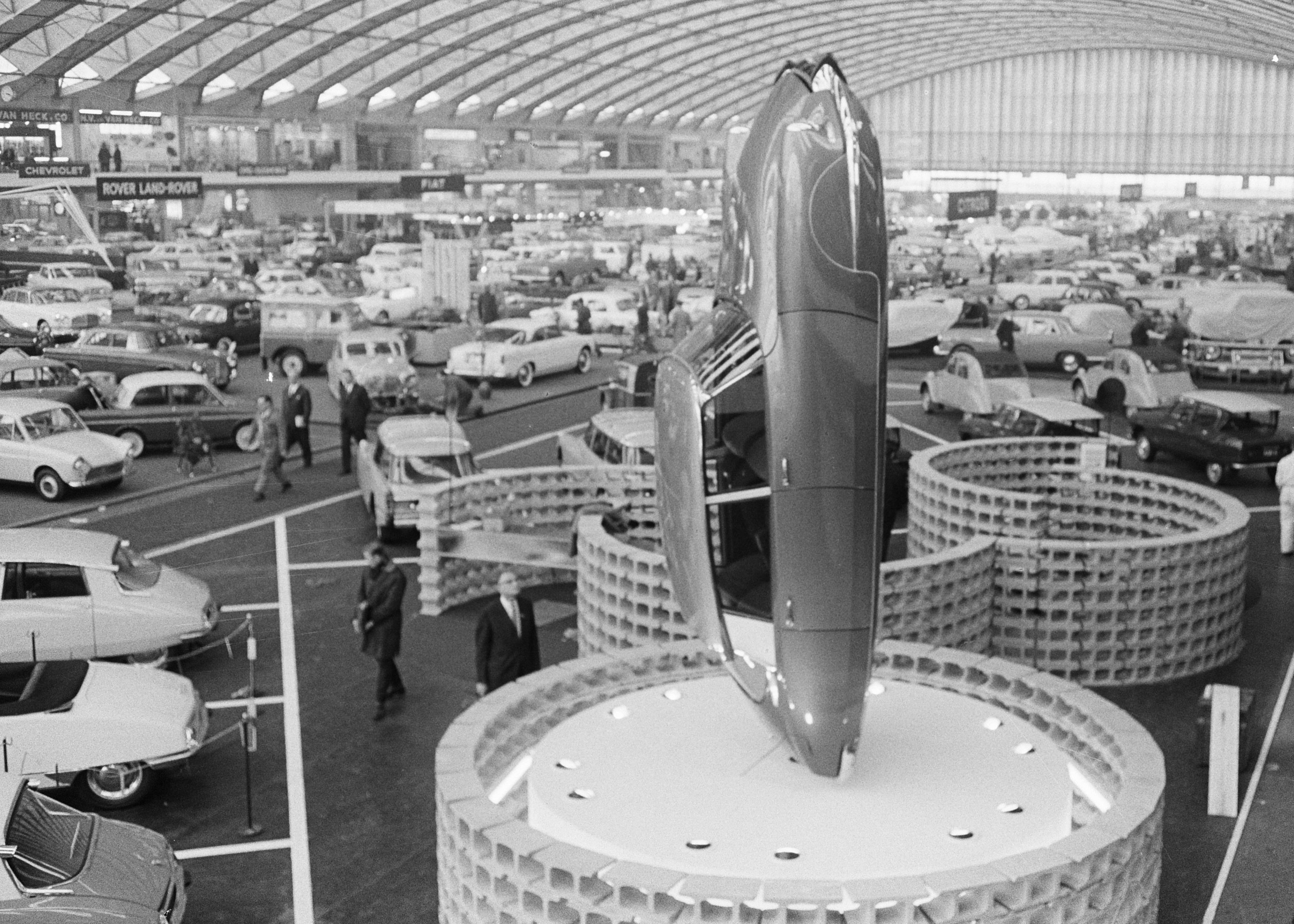
At the 1963 Amsterdam International Autoshow, Citroën presented a DS body as a sculpture, upright like a rocket, on a rotating platform.

It also posited the nation's relevance in the Space Age, during the global race for technology of the Cold War. Structuralist philosopher Roland Barthes, in an essay about the car, said that it looked as if it had "fallen from the sky". An American advertisement summarised this selling point: "It takes a special person to drive a special car".

Because the company was owned by the technologically aggressive tyre manufacturer Michelin, Citroën had designed their cars around the technologically superior radial tyre since 1948, and the DS was no exception.

The car used double wishbone suspension with L-shaped arms at the front and trailing-arms at the rear, with totally novel hydropneumatic spring and damper units. The car's advanced hydraulics included automatic self-levelling and driver adjustable ride-height, developed in-house by Paul Magès. This suspension allowed the DS to travel quickly on the poor road surfaces then common in France.

In addition, the vehicle had power steering and a semi-automatic transmission (the transmission required no clutch pedal but gears still had to be shifted by hand, with the shift lever controlling a powered hydraulic shift mechanism in place of a mechanical linkage). It had a fibreglass roof which lowered the centre of gravity, and so reduced weight transfer. Inboard front disc brakes (as well as independent suspension) reduced unsprung weight. Different front and rear track widths reduced the unequal tyre loading, which is well known to promote understeer, typical of front-engined and front-wheel drive cars. Although disc brakes had been tried on a car as early as 1902 by the British Lanchester Motor Company, volume production had not been applied until 1949, by USA small car manufacturer Crosley, but without success. The Citroën DS was the first successful fielding of disc brakes on a mass-produced car.

Furthermore, at launch the DS featured innovative centerlock wheels which used a captive Allen bolt as the central fastener whilst a hexagonal protrusion transferred the drive to a matching recess in the wheel. This made it possible to change the wheel very quickly in the event of a puncture and proved an advantage in motor racing.

As with all French cars, the DS design was affected by the tax horsepower system, which effectively encouraged smaller engines. Unlike the Traction Avant predecessor, there was no top-of-range model with a powerful six-cylinder engine. Citroën had planned an air-cooled flat-6 engine for the car, but did not have the funds to put the prototype engine into production.

The DS placed fifth on the 2005 list of "100 Coolest Cars" by Automobile Magazine. It was also named the most beautiful car of all time by Classic & Sports Car magazine after a poll of 20 world-renowned car designers, including Giorgetto Giugiaro, Ian Callum, Roy Axe, Paul Bracq, and Leonardo Fioravanti.

== Motorsport ==
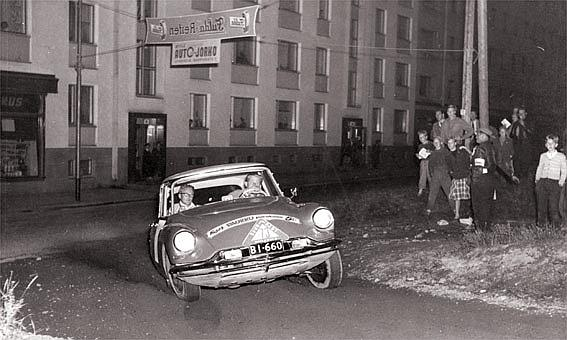
DS19 at the 1956 1000 Lakes Rally

The DS was successful in motorsports like rallying, where sustained speeds on poor surfaces are paramount, and won the Monte Carlo Rally in 1959. In the 1000 Lakes Rally, Pauli Toivonen drove a DS19 to victory in 1962.

In 1966, the DS won the Monte Carlo Rally again, with some controversy as the competitive BMC Mini-Cooper team was disqualified due to rule infractions. Robert Neyret won the Rallye du Maroc in 1969 and 1970 in a DS 21.

The DS was still competitive in the grueling 1974 London-Sahara-Munich World Cup Rally, where it won over 70 other cars, only 5 of which even completed the entire event.

== Technical innovation – hydraulic systems ==
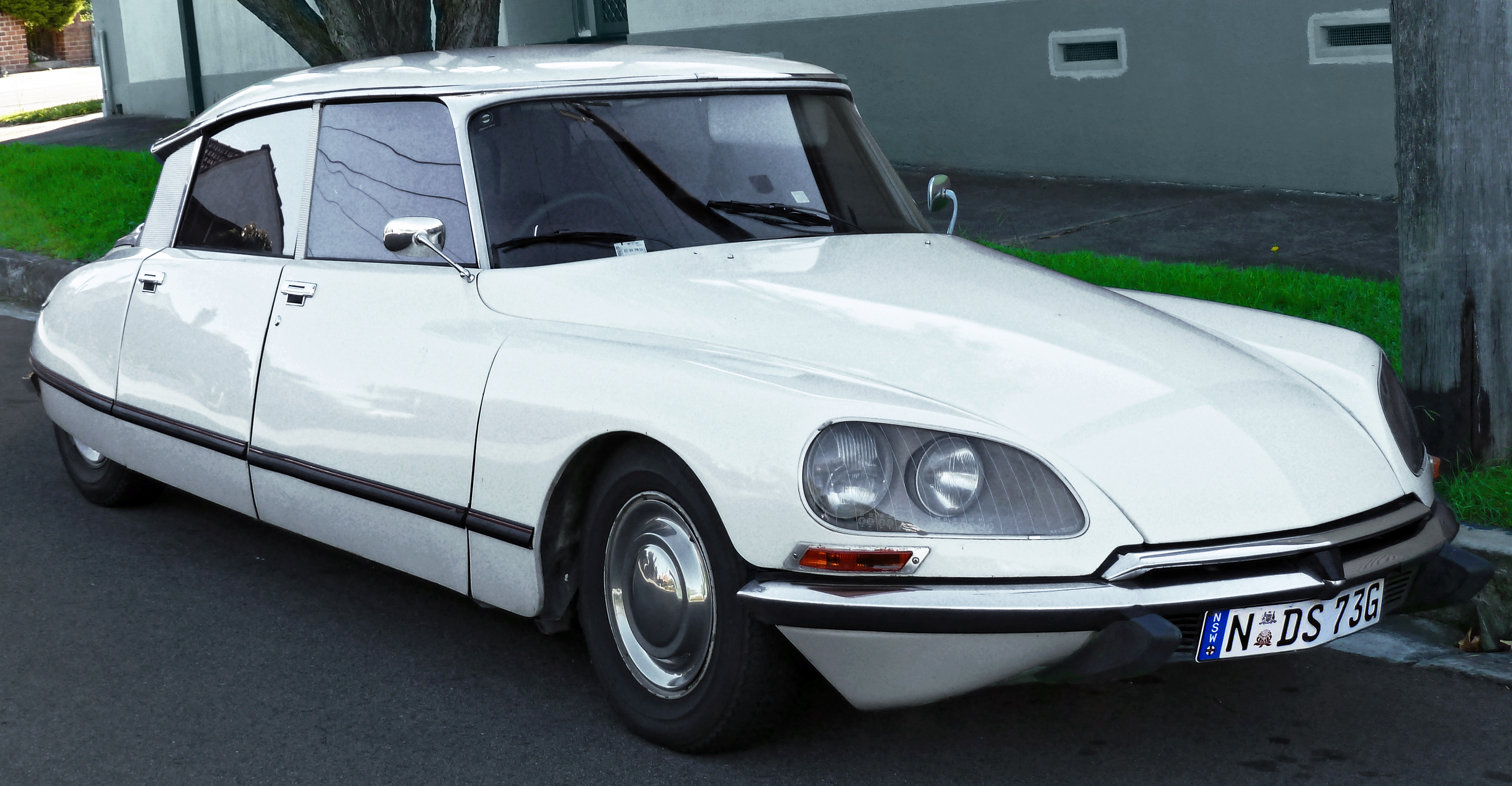
At rest, Citroën DS will slowly sink to the ground as the engine-driven hydraulic system is depressurized.

In conventional cars, hydraulics are only used in brakes and power steering. In the DS they were also used for the suspension, clutch, and transmission. The cheaper 1957 ID19 did have manual steering and a simplified power braking system. An engine-driven pump pressurizes the closed system to 17.2 MPa (2,490 psi)

At a time when few passenger vehicles had independent suspension on all wheels, the application of the hydraulic system to the car's suspension system to provide a self-levelling system was an innovative move. This suspension allowed the car to achieve sharp handling combined with very high ride quality, frequently compared to a "magic carpet".

The hydropneumatic suspension used was pioneered the year before, on the rear of another car from Citroën, the top of range Traction Avant 15CV-H.

== Effect on Citroën brand development ==
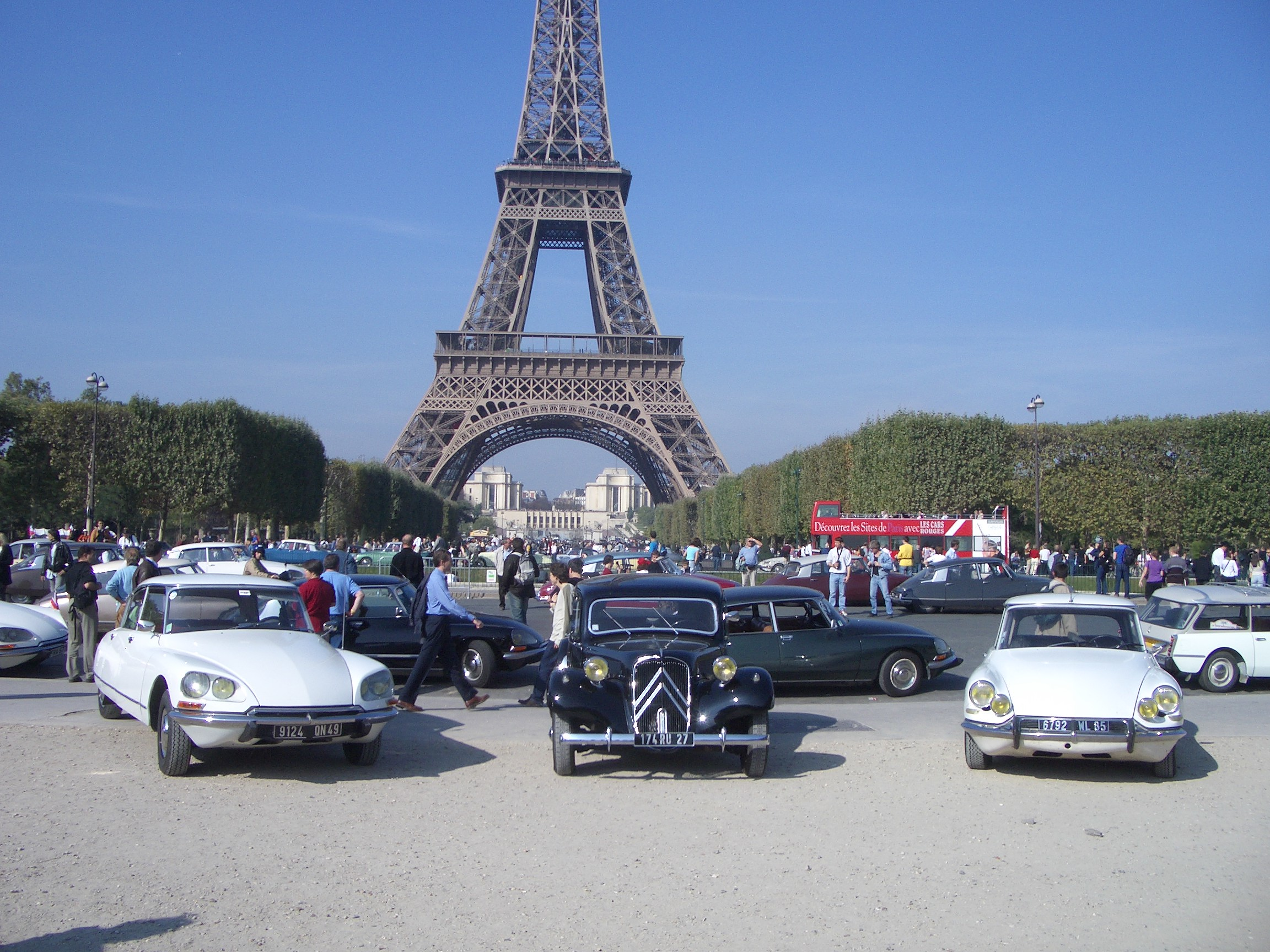
Two DS and Traction Avant

The 1955 DS cemented the Citroën brand name as an automotive innovator, building on the success of the Traction Avant, which had been the world's first mass-produced unitary body front-wheel-drive car in 1934. In fact, the DS caused such a huge sensation that Citroën was apprehensive that future models would not be of the same bold standard. No clean sheet new models were introduced from 1955 to 1970.

The DS was a large, expensive executive car and a downward brand extension was attempted, but without result. Throughout the late 1950s and 1960s, Citroën developed many new vehicles for the very large, profitable market segments between the 2CV and the DS, occupied by vehicles like the Peugeot 403, Renault 16 and Ford Cortina, but none made it into production. Either they had uneconomic build costs, or were ordinary "me too" cars, not up to the company's high standard of innovation. As Citroën was owned by Michelin from 1934 to 1974 as a sort of research laboratory, such broad experimentation was possible. Michelin was getting a powerful advertisement for the capabilities of the radial tyre Michelin had invented, when such experimentation was successful.

New models based on the small, utilitarian 2CV economy car were introduced, such as the 1961 Ami. It was also designed by Flaminio Bertoni and aimed to combine Three-box styling with the chassis of the 2CV. The Ami was very successful in France, but less so on export markets. Many found the styling controversial, and the car noisy and underpowered. The Dyane was a modernised 2CV with a hatchback that competed with the 2CV inspired Renault 4 hatchback. All these two-cylinder models were very small, so there remained a wide market gap to the DS range all through the 1960s.

In 1970, Citroën finally introduced a car to target the mid-range – the Citroën GS, which won the "European car of the Year" for 1971 and sold 2.5 million units. It combined a small 41 kW (55 hp) flat-four air-cooled engine with Hydropneumatic suspension. The intended 79 kW (106 hp) Wankel rotary-engined version with more power did not reach full production.

== Replacing the DS ==
The DS maintained sales and remained competitive throughout its production run. Its peak production year was 1970. Certain design elements like the somewhat narrow cabin, column-mounted gearstick, and separate fenders began to seem a little old-fashioned in the 1970s.

Citroën invested enormous resources to design and launch an entirely new vehicle in 1970, the SM, which was in effect a thoroughly modernized DS, with similar length, but greater width. The manual gearbox was a modified DS unit. The front disc brakes were the same design. Axles, wheel bearings, steering knuckles, and hydraulic components were either DS parts or modified DS parts.

The SM had a different purpose than replacing the 15-year-old DS design, however – it was meant to launch Citroën into a completely new luxury grand touring market segment. Only fitted with a costly, exotic Maserati engine, the SM was faster and much more expensive than the DS. The SM was not designed to be a practical 4-door saloon suitable as a large family car, the key market for vehicles of this type in Europe. Typically, manufacturers would introduce low-volume coupés based on parts shared with an existing saloon, not as unique models, a contemporary example being the Mercedes-Benz SLC (C107). BMW follows a similar strategy of a mid-size sedan (5 series), large coupe (6 series), and large sedan (7 series) sharing common underpinnings.

The SM's high price and limited utility of the 2+2 seating configuration meant the SM as actually produced could not seize the mantle from the DS. While the design funds invested would allow the DS to be replaced by two cars, a 'modern DS' and the smaller CX, it was left to the CX alone to provide Citroën's large family or executive car in the model range.

The last DS came off the production line on 24 April 1975 – with Citroën building up approximately eight months of inventory of the 'Shooting brake'/'Safari' (estate/station wagon) version of the DS, to continue sales until the autumn of 1975 when the estate/station wagon version of the CX would be introduced.

== Development ==
The DS maintained its size and shape, with easily removable, unstressed body panels, but design changes occurred. During the 20-year production, improvements were made on an ongoing basis.

=== ID 19 submodel to extend brand downwards (1957–1969) ===
The 1955 DS19 was 65% more expensive than the car it replaced, the Citroën Traction Avant. This affected potential sales in a country still recovering economically from World War II, so a cheaper submodel, the Citroën ID, was introduced in 1957.

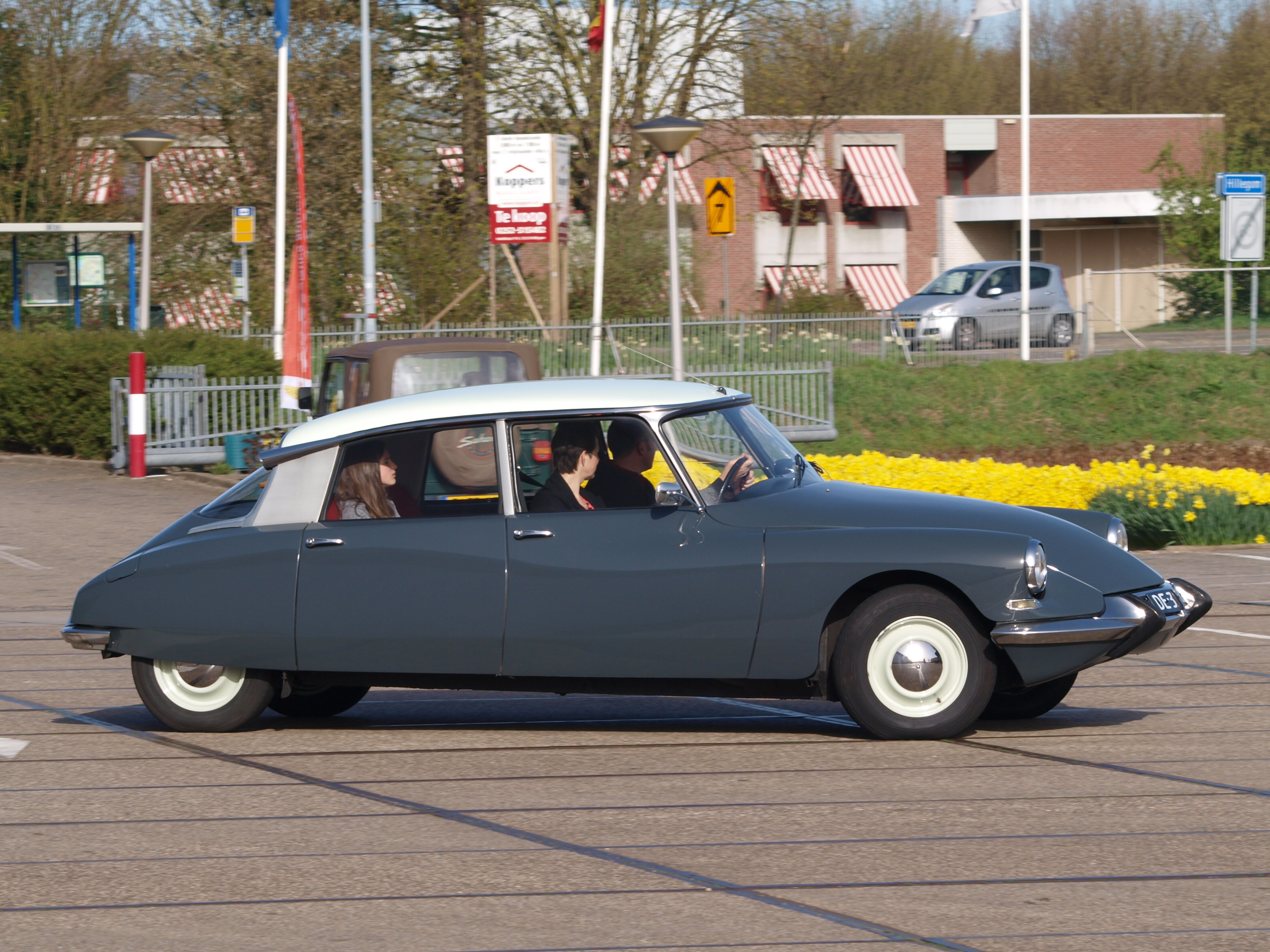
1967 Citroën ID19B

The ID shared the DS's body but was less powerful and luxurious. Although it shared the engine capacity of the DS engine (at this stage 1,911 cc), the ID provided a maximum power output of only 51 kW (69 hp) compared to the 56 kW (75 hp) claimed for the DS19. Power outputs were further differentiated in 1961 when the DS19 acquired a Weber-32 twin bodied carburettor, and the increasing availability of higher octane fuel enabled the manufacturer to increase the compression ratio from 7.5:1 to 8.5:1. A new DS19 now came with a promised 62 kW (83 hp). The ID19 was also more traditional mechanically: it had no power steering and had conventional transmission and clutch instead of the DS's hydraulically controlled set-up. Initially, the basic ID19 was sold on the French market with a price saving of more than 25% against the DS, although the differential was reduced at the end of 1961 when the manufacturer withdrew the entry-level ID19 "Normale". A station wagon variant, the ID Break, was introduced in 1958.

=== D Spécial and D Super (1970–1975) ===
The ID was replaced by the D Spécial and D Super in 1970, but these retained the lower specification position in the range. The D Super was available with the DS21 2175 cc engine and a 5-speed gearbox, and named the D Super 5.

=== Series 2 – Nose redesign in 1962 ===
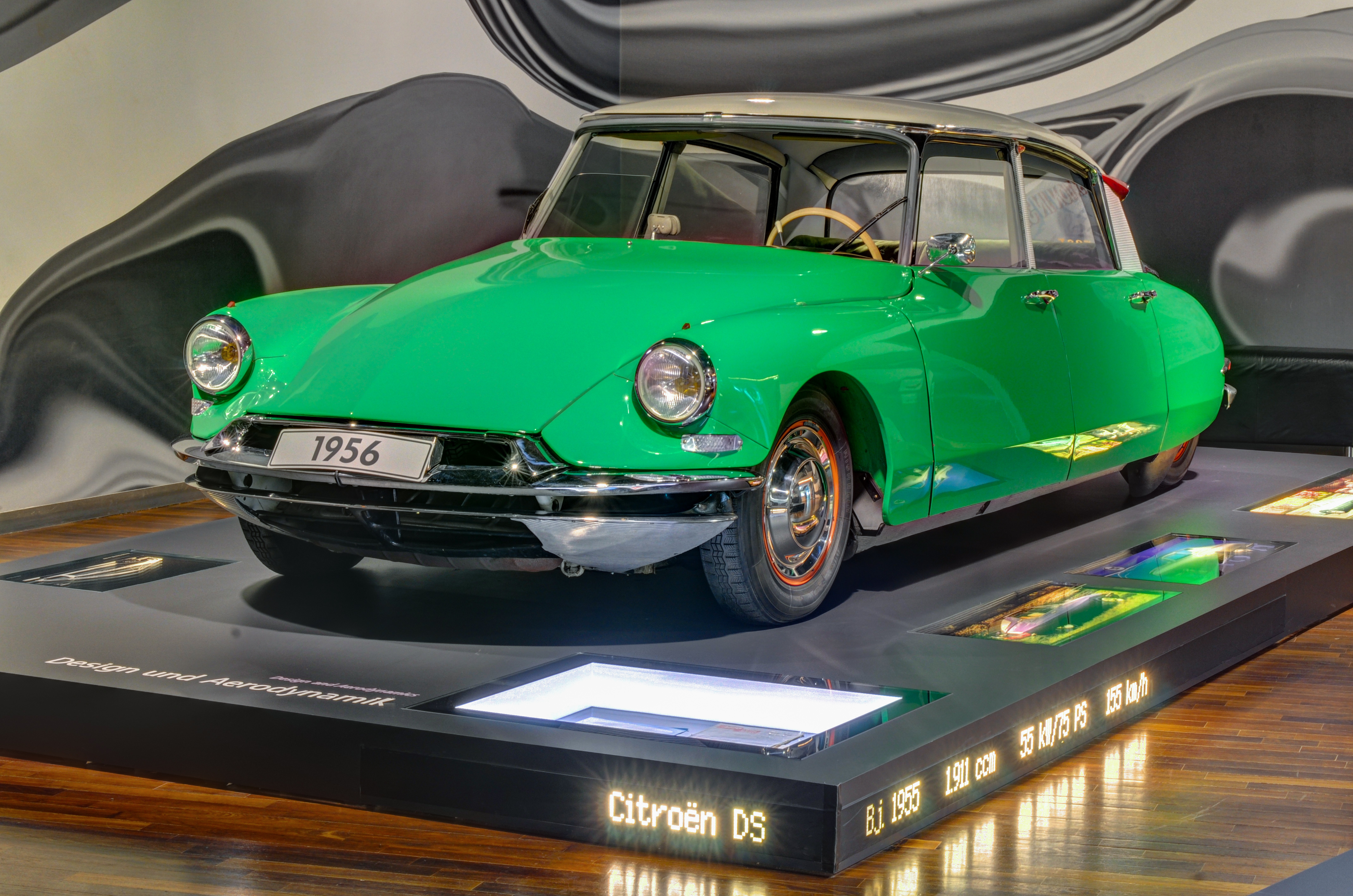
1956 Citroën DS in the Museum der Autostadt Wolfsburg, showing Series 1 (1955–1962) original nose

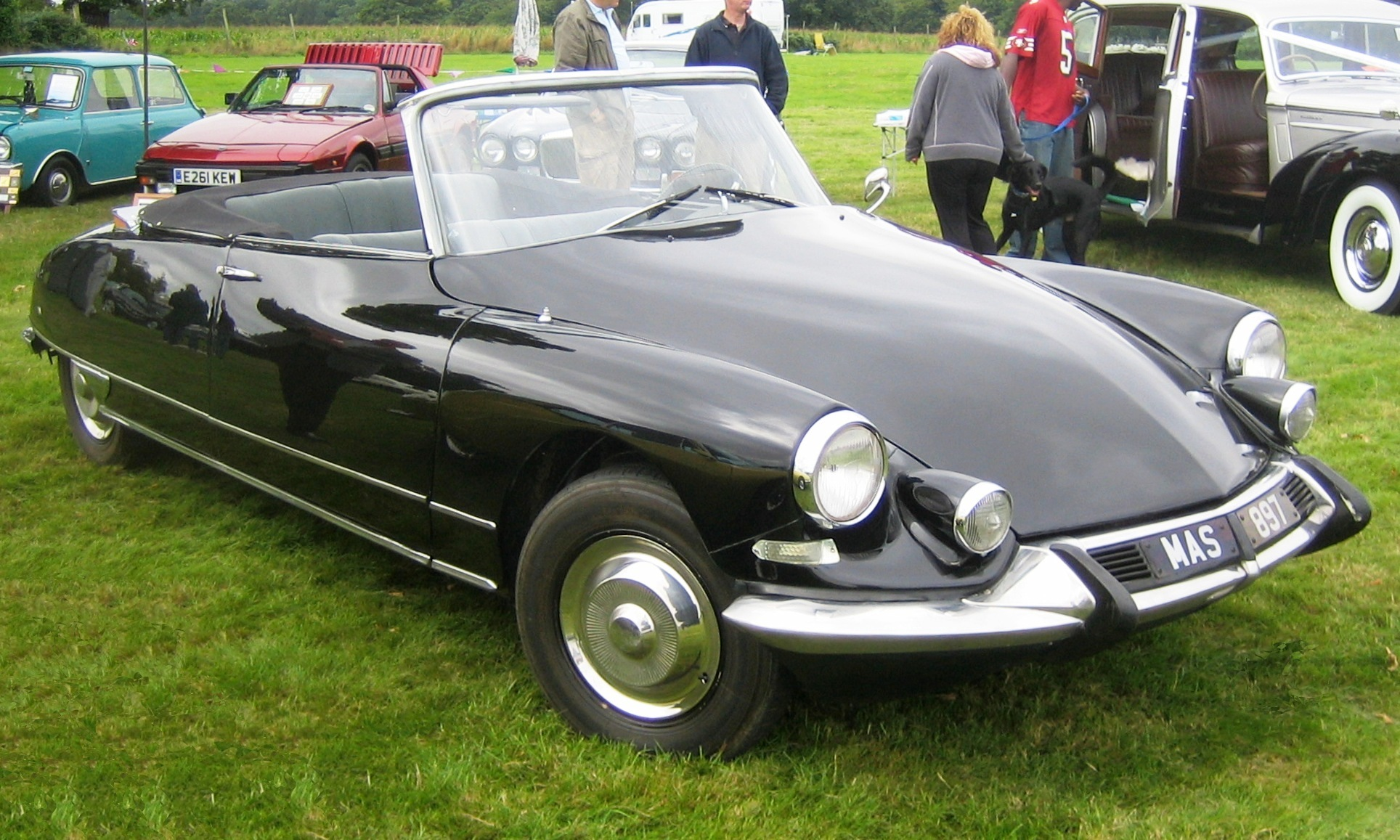
Citroën DS Convertible – Series 2 (1963–1967) – redesigned nose

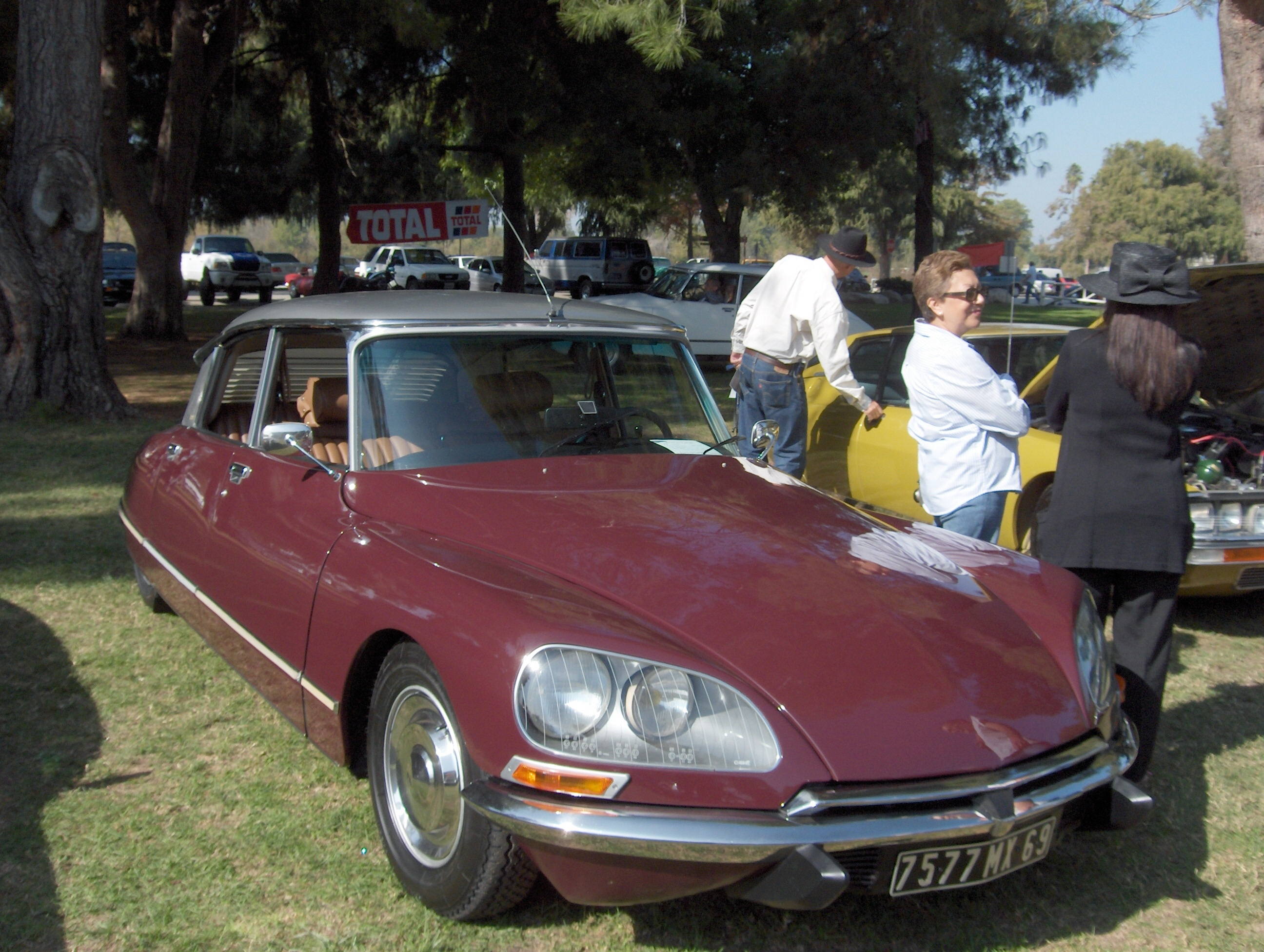
1974 Citroën DS23 Pallas – Series 3 (1968–1975) with four headlights under glass

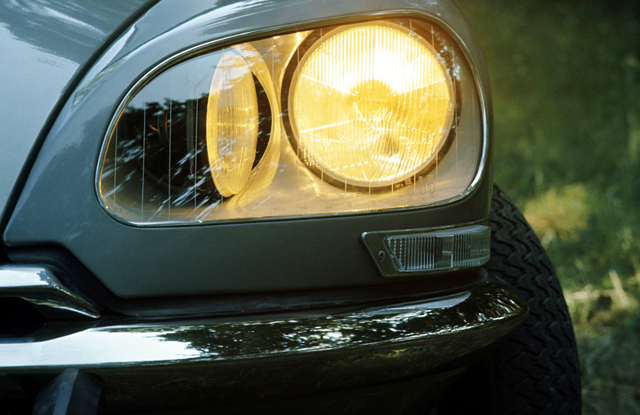
Directional headlight detail of a DS21

In September 1962, the DS was restyled with a more aerodynamically efficient nose, better ventilation, and other improvements. It retained the open two headlamp appearance, but was available with an optional set of driving lights mounted on the front fenders. All models in the range changed nose design at the same time, including the ID and station wagon models.

=== Series 3 – Nose redesign in 1967 with directional headlights ===
In late 1967, for the 1968 model year, the DS and ID was again restyled, by Robert Opron, who also styled the 1970 SM and 1974 CX. This version had a more streamlined headlamp design. This design had four headlights under a smooth glass canopy and the inner set swivelled with the steering wheel. This allowed the driver to see "around" turns, especially valuable on twisting roads driven at high speed at night. The directional headlamps were linked to the wheels by cable.

Behind each glass cover lens, the inboard high-beam headlamp swivels by up to 80° as the driver steers, throwing the beam along the driver's intended path rather than uselessly across the curved road. The outboard low-beam headlamps are self-leveling in response to pitching caused by acceleration and braking.

Because this feature was not allowed in the US (see World Forum for Harmonization of Vehicle Regulations), a version with four exposed headlights that did not swivel was manufactured for the US market.

Although a directional headlight was previously seen on the 1948 Tucker 48 'Torpedo', Citroën was the first to mass-market adaptive headlights.

=== New "green" hydraulic fluid ===
The original hydropneumatic system used a vegetable oil (liquide hydraulique végétal, LHV), but later switched to a synthetic (liquide hydraulique synthétique, LHS). Both had the disadvantage of being hygroscopic. Disuse allows water to enter the hydraulic components, causing deterioration and requiring expensive maintenance. The difficulty with hygroscopic hydraulic fluid was exacerbated in the DS/ID due to the extreme rise and fall in the fluid level in the reservoir, which went from nearly full to nearly empty when the suspension extended to maximum height and the six accumulators in the system filled with fluid. With every "inhalation" of fresh moisture- (and dust-) laden air, the fluid absorbed more water.

For the 1967 model year, Citroën introduced a new mineral oil-based fluid LHM (liquide hydraulique minéral). This fluid was much less harsh on the system.

LHM required completely different materials for the seals. Using either fluid in the incorrect system would completely destroy the hydraulic seals very quickly. To help avoid this problem, Citroën added a bright green dye to the LHM fluid and also painted all hydraulic elements bright green. The earlier LHS parts were painted black.

All models, including the station wagon and ID, were upgraded at the same time. The hydraulic fluid changed to the technically superior LHM in all markets except the US and Canada, where the change did not take place until January 1969 due to local regulations.

== International sales and production ==
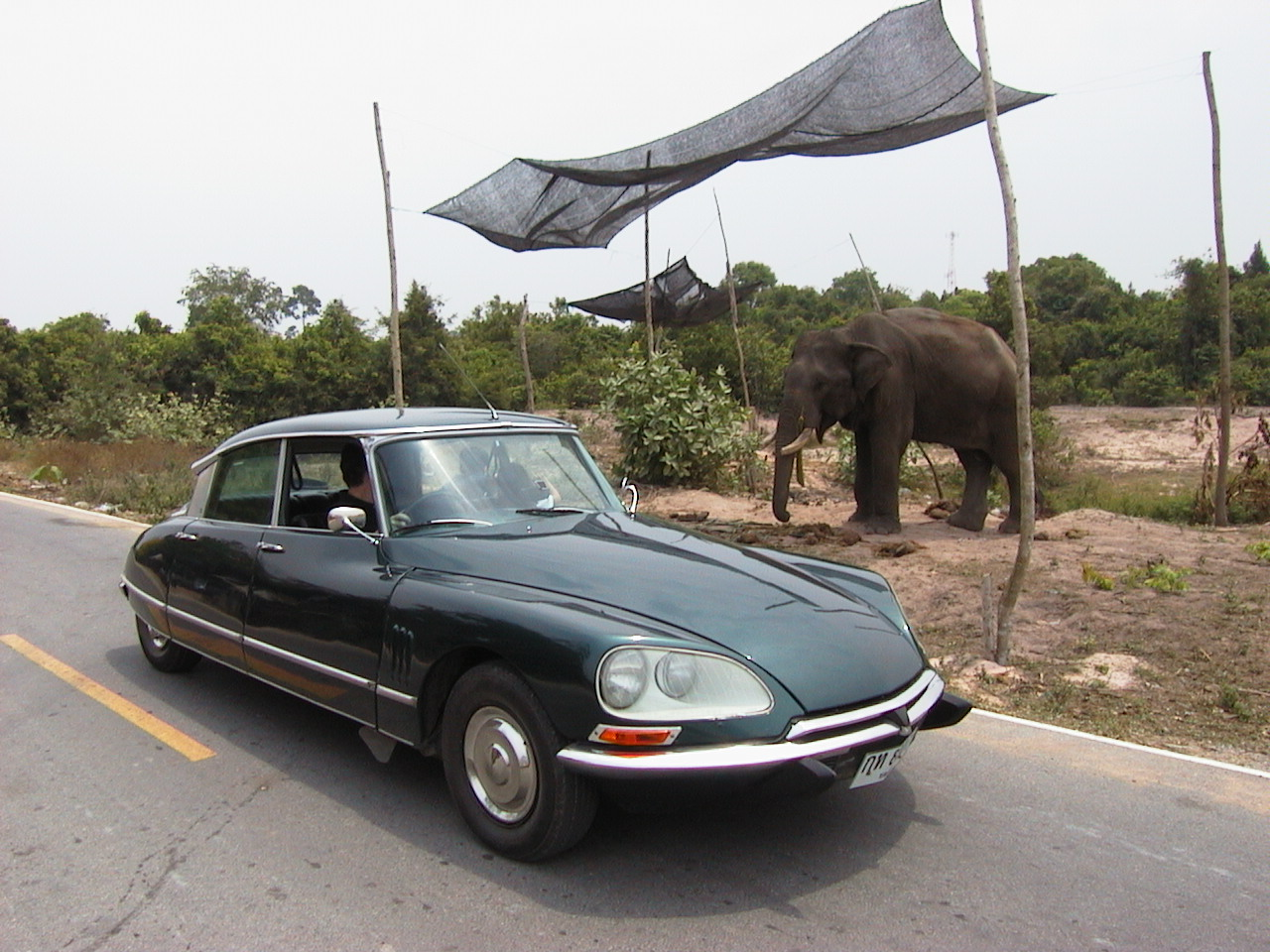
1972 DS in Thailand with special cooling vents

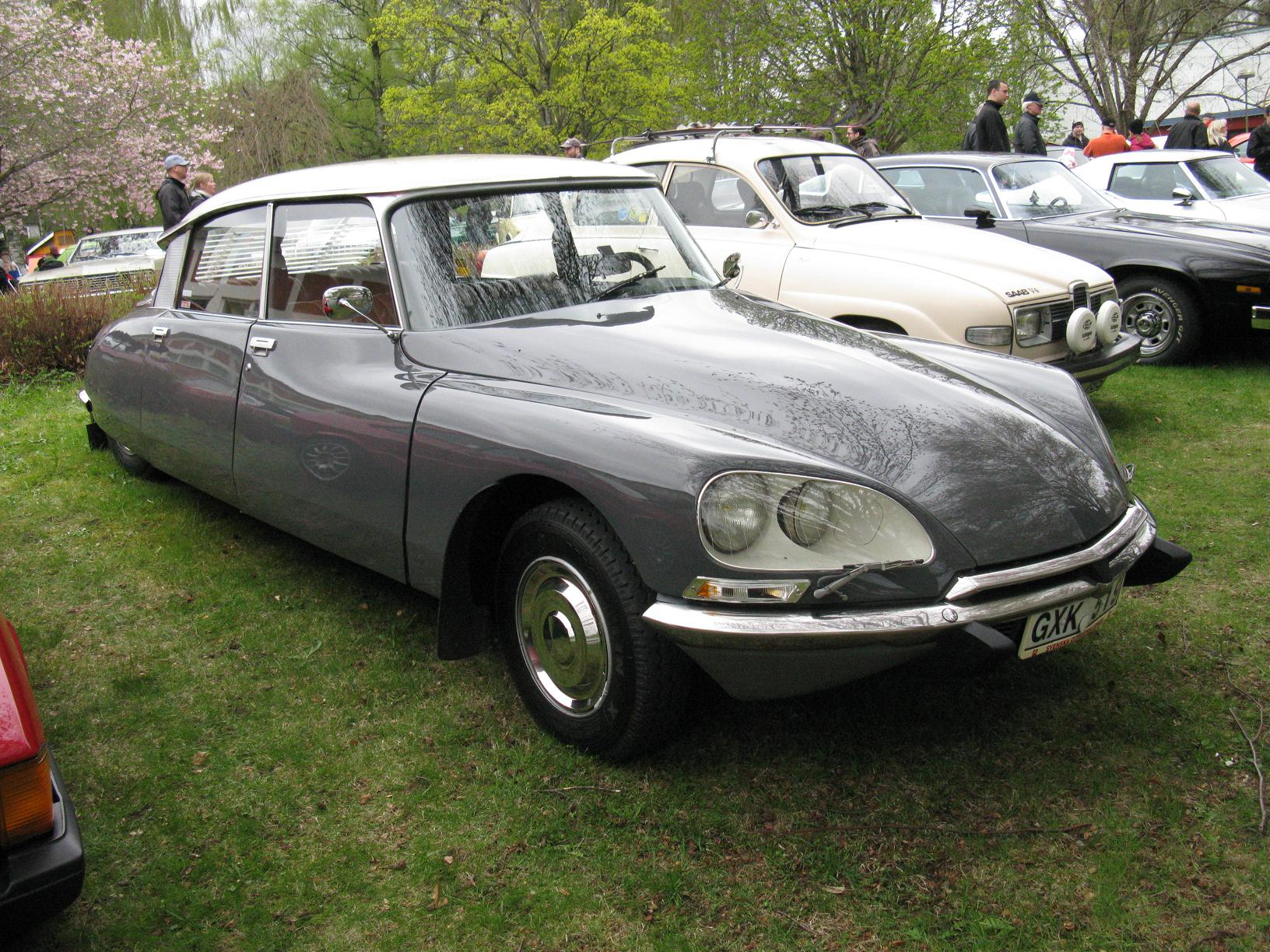
Swedish-spec Citroën DS with headlight wipers

The DS was primarily manufactured at the Quai André-Citroën in the Javel neighborhood of Paris, with other manufacturing facilities in the United Kingdom, South Africa, the former Yugoslavia (mostly Break Ambulances), and Australia.

Australia constructed their own D variant in the 1960s at Heidelberg, Victoria, identified as the ID 19 "Parisienne." Australian market cars were fitted with options as standard equipment such as the "DSpecial DeLuxe" that were not available on domestic European models.

Until 1965 UK cars were assembled at the manufacturer's Slough premises, to the west of London, using a combination of French-made knock down kits and locally sourced components, some of them machined on site. A French electrical system superseded the British one on the Slough cars in 1962, giving rise to a switch to "continental style" negative earthing. An intermediate model between the DS and the ID, called the DW, was introduced on the UK market in 1963 with a manual transmission and simpler foot-operated clutch while retaining the DS power unit, power steering and power braking; outside of the UK this model was known as the DS19M. When the 1985 cc engine replaced the original 1911 cc unit in September 1965 the manual-equipped DSes built in Slough were renamed DS19A. The Slough factory closed on 18 February 1966 and thereafter cars for the British market were imported fully assembled from the company's French plant. The British-built cars are distinguished by their leather seats, wooden (early ID19 models) or one-piece plastic (early DS19 models) dashboards, chromed number plate mount set into the front bumper, and (on pre-1962 cars) Lucas-made electrics. These were all right hand drive cars.

The DS was built and sold in South Africa from 1959 to 1975.

The DS was sold in Japan, but the models were built in France and left hand drive.

== DS in North America ==
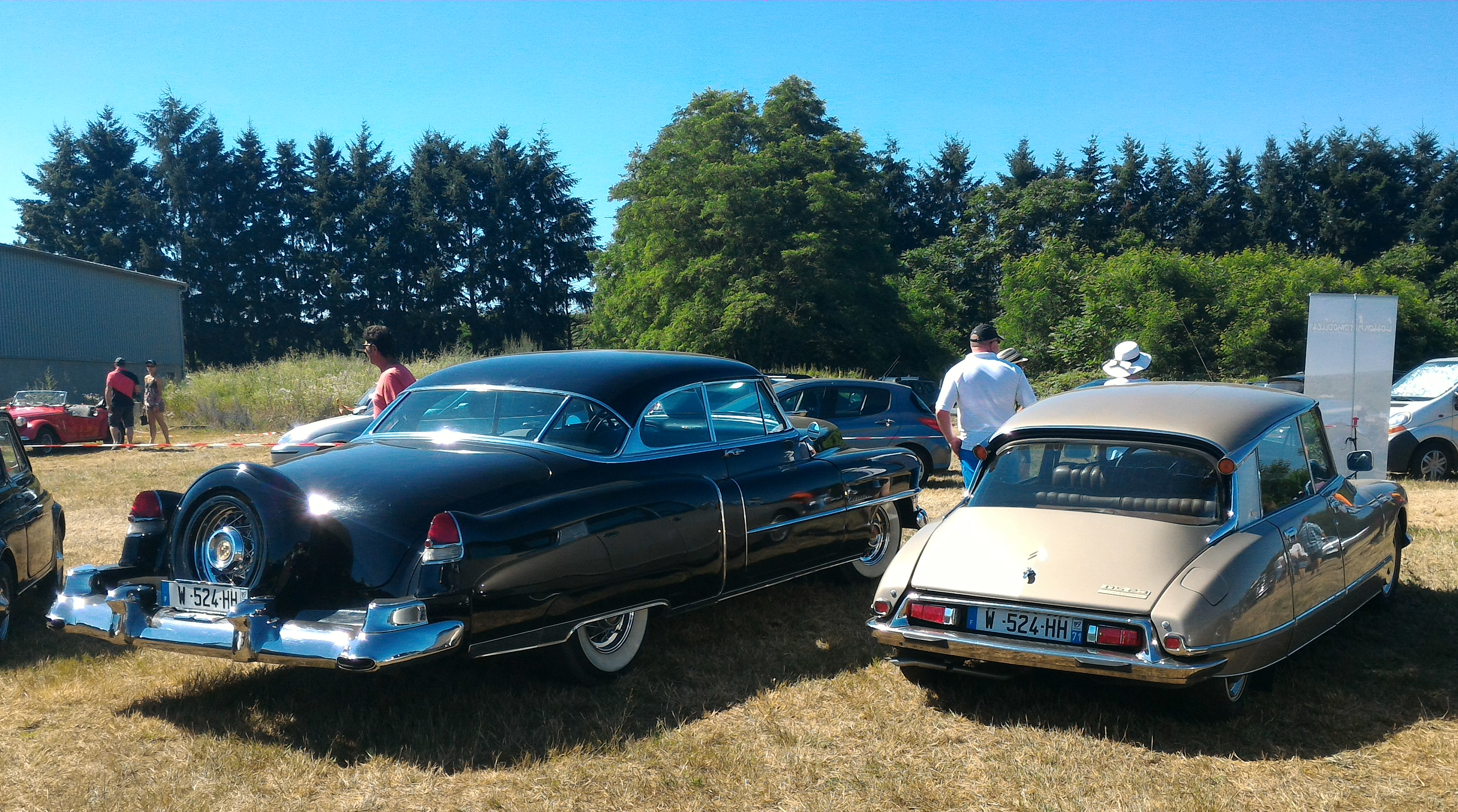
Cadillac much larger than DS externally

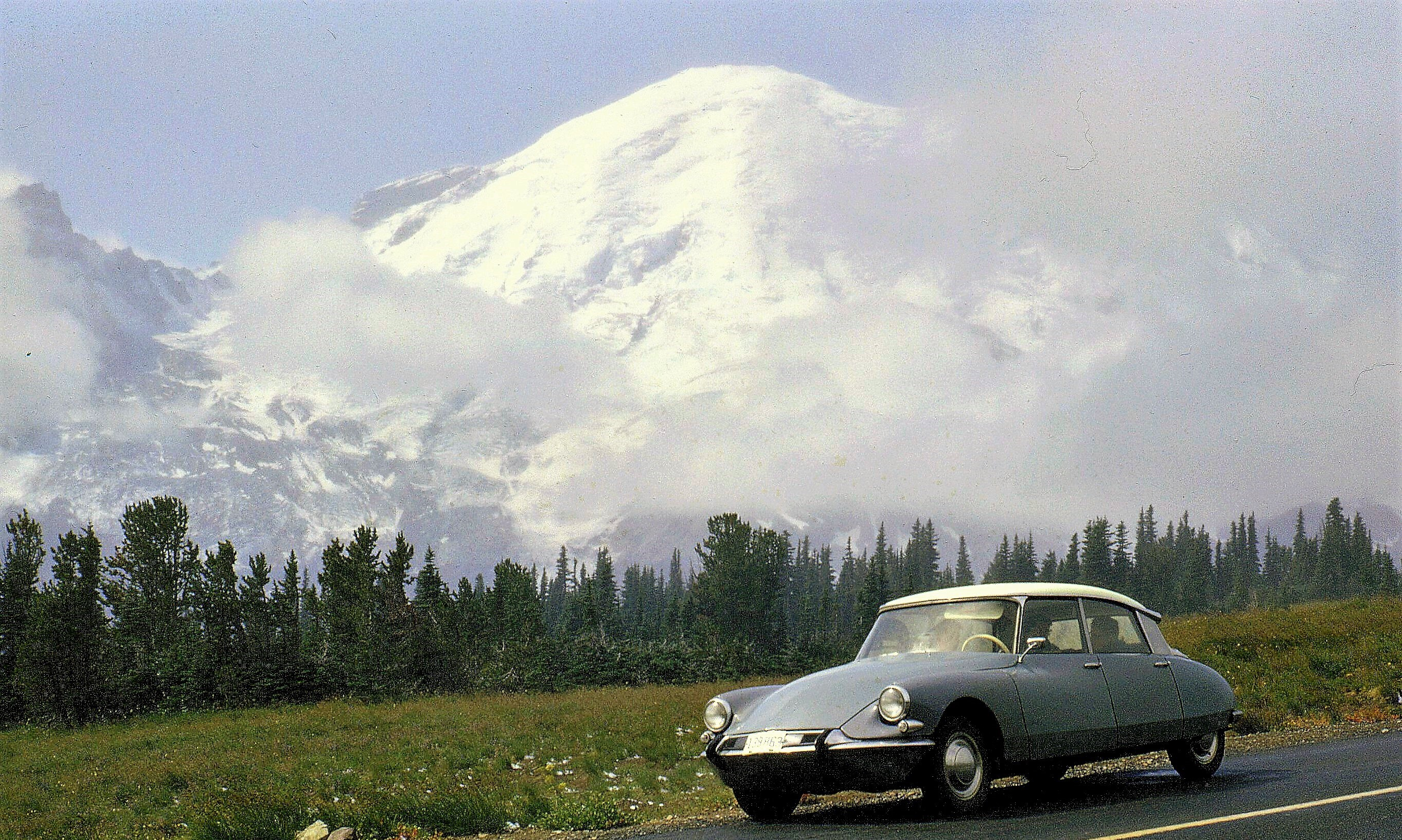
DS Citroën near Mount Baker, Washington, USA, ca. 1970

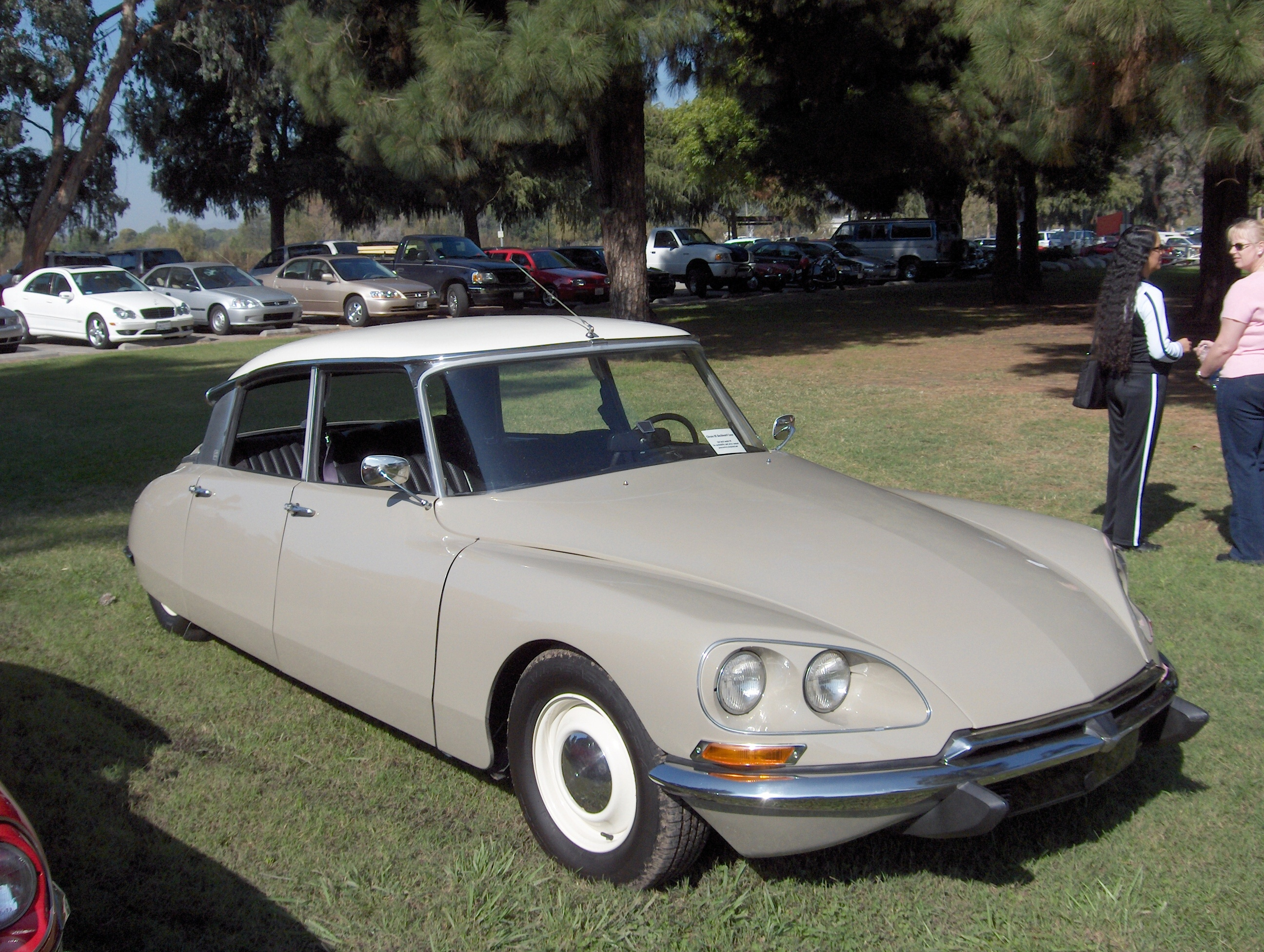
US-spec 1969 Citroën DS with exposed headlights

The DS was sold in North America from 1956 to 1972. Despite its popularity in Europe and regard for its design from the American motoring press, it did not sell well in the United States, and little better in Canada. While promoted as a luxury car, it did not have the basic features that American buyers expected to find on such a vehicle, such as an automatic transmission, air conditioning, power windows, or a powerful engine. The DS was designed specifically to address the French market, with punitive tax horsepower taxation of large engines and very poor roads, and not for a market where those constraints were removed.

Further harming the DS' prospects on the other side of the Atlantic was an inadequate supply of parts for the vehicle. Jay Leno described the sporadic supply of spare parts as a problem for 1970s era customers, based on his early experiences working at a Citroën dealer in Boston. Additionally, the DS was expensive, with a 115 hp (86 kW) vehicle costing $4,170 in 1969, when $4,500 would buy a 360 hp (268 kW) Buick Electra 225 Custom. The Electra was available with an automatic transmission, power windows, and came with a much larger engine (a 7,040 cc V8), and it was hardly the only competitor to the DS to have these features as options or as standard.

As a result of the insufficient supply of replacement parts, an inability to compete with bigger and more luxurious cars sold for the same price, and simply having not been designed for the North American market, sales for the DS were mediocre on the North American market, ultimately reaching a total of 38,000.

US regulations at the time also banned one of the car's more advanced features: its composite headlamps with aerodynamic covered lenses. Based on legislation that dated from 1940, all automobiles sold in the U.S. were required to have round, sealed-beam headlamps that produced 75,000 candlepower or (73575 candela) maximum. The DS's quartz iodine swiveling headlamps designed for the 1968 model were not allowed by the regulations. Even the aerodynamic headlight covers, featured on other cars such as the Jaguar E-Type were illegal and had to be removed. It was not until Ford Motor Company lobbied to have composite headlamps allowed that the sealed-beam headlamp requirements were finally rescinded in 1983.

However, the European lamps were legal in Canada, including the directional headlamps.

The hydraulic fluid change in 1967 also fell afoul of American regulations. NHTSA follows the precautionary principle, also used by the Food and Drug Administration, where new innovations are prohibited until their developers can prove them safe to the regulators. The castor-based LHV and synthetic LHS fluids used in European-market DSes were not certified for use in North America, so cars sold there used conventional brake fluid instead. Brake fluid (as well as LHV and LHS) is hygroscopic and miscible, readily absorbing and mixing with moisture, the idea being that within a closed hydraulic circuit these properties will ensure pockets of non-soluble water will not form and cause corrosion of the system from within. The design of the DS's hydraulic system used much more fluid and allowed much more moist air into the system than a simple hydraulic braking circuit, so the fluid's hygroscopic properties were not preventing corrosion as intended. Brake fluid also did not provide the viscosity and lubricity suited for used in the suspension, clutch and gear change mechanism. Mineral-based LHM fluid was designed to remedy these issues but Citroen was obligated to demonstrate the new fluid was safe for automotive use before it could be installed in American-market cars. It took NHTSA until January 1969 to approve it, so in the US market about half the production of cars in the 1969 model year use the older red LHS fluid and half use newer green LHM fluid, neither of which is compatible with the other.

== Design variations ==
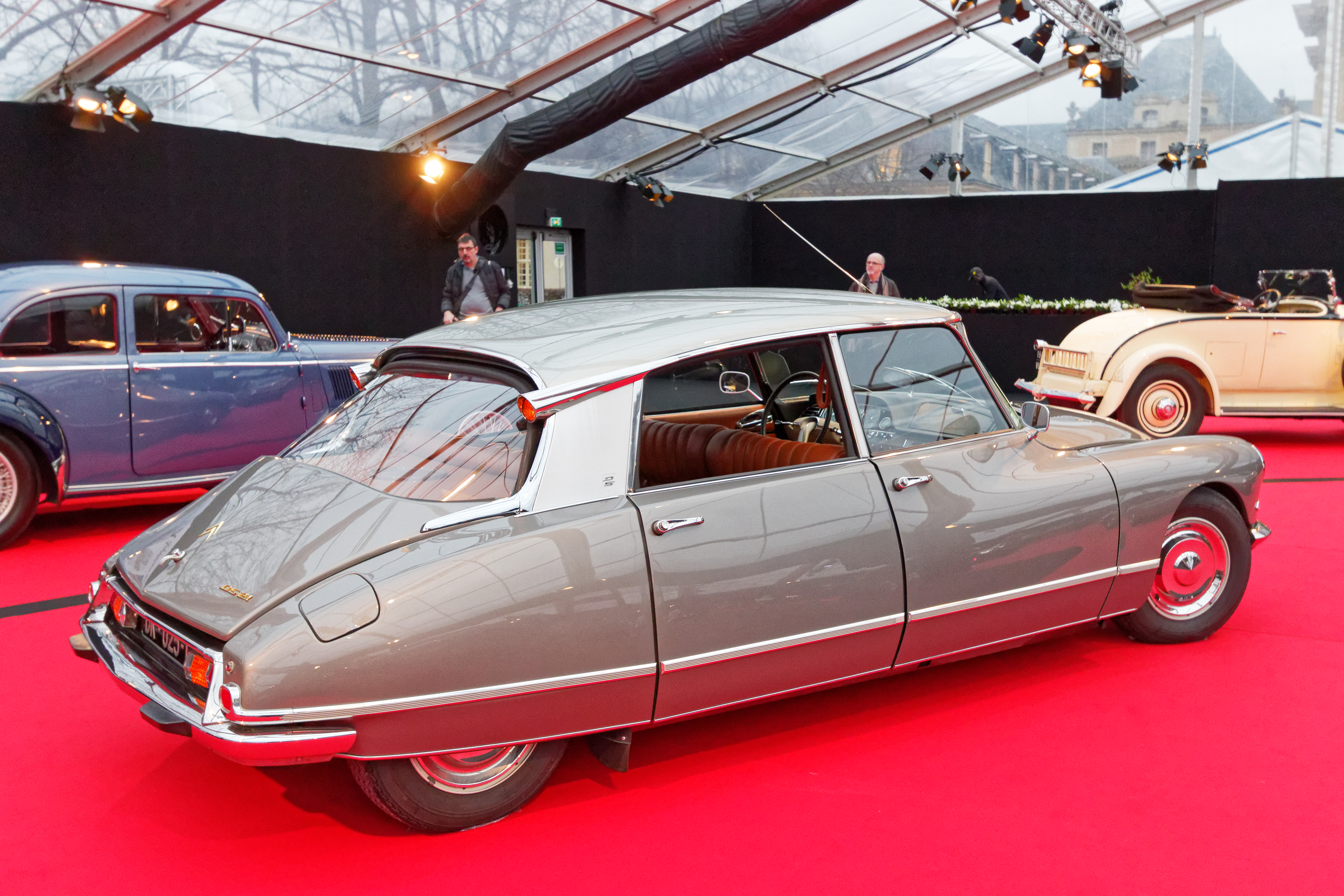
DS21 Pallas – distinct C-pillar design

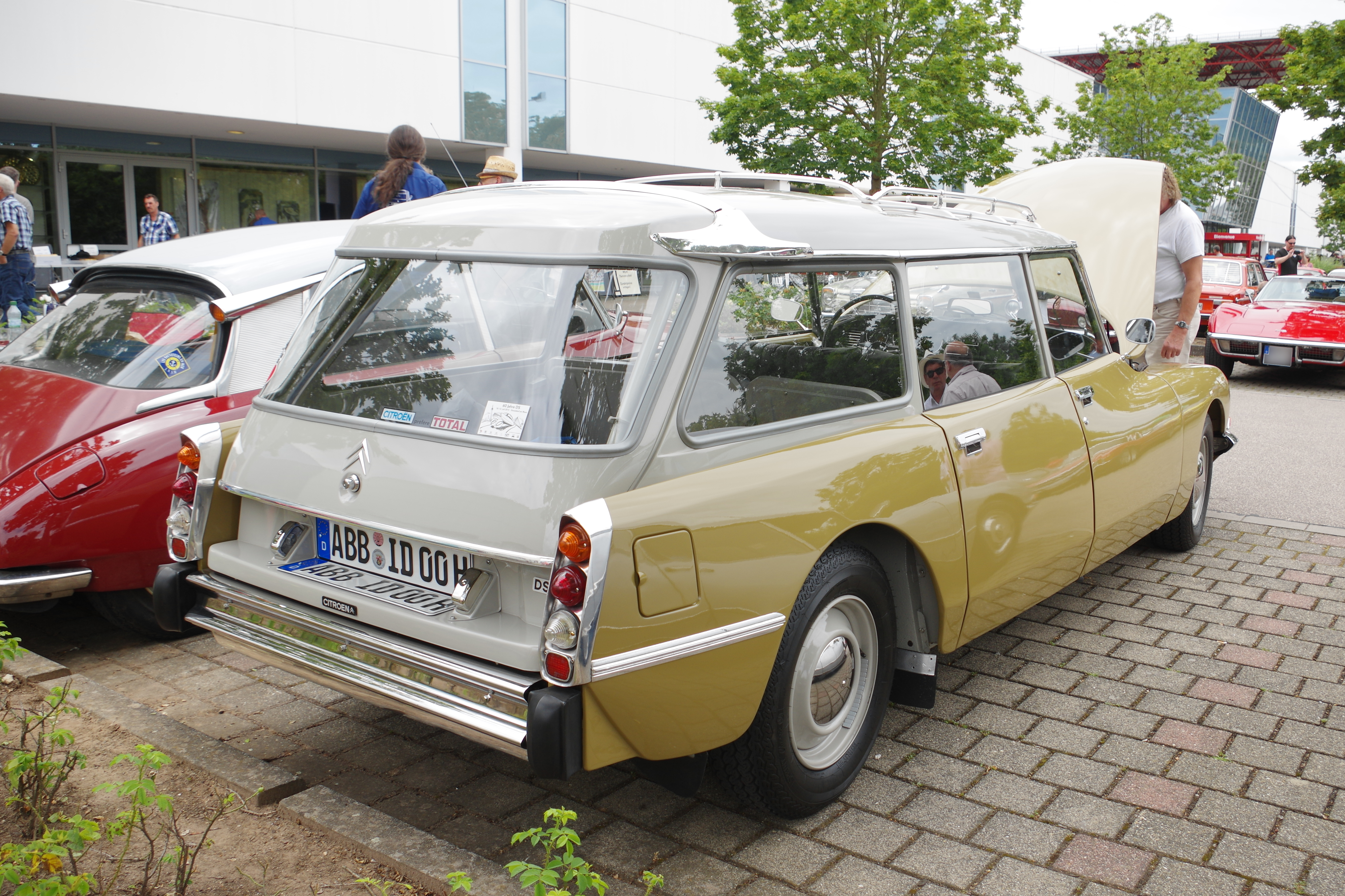
Citroën DS Station Wagon – also known as the Safari, Break, Familiale, or Wagon

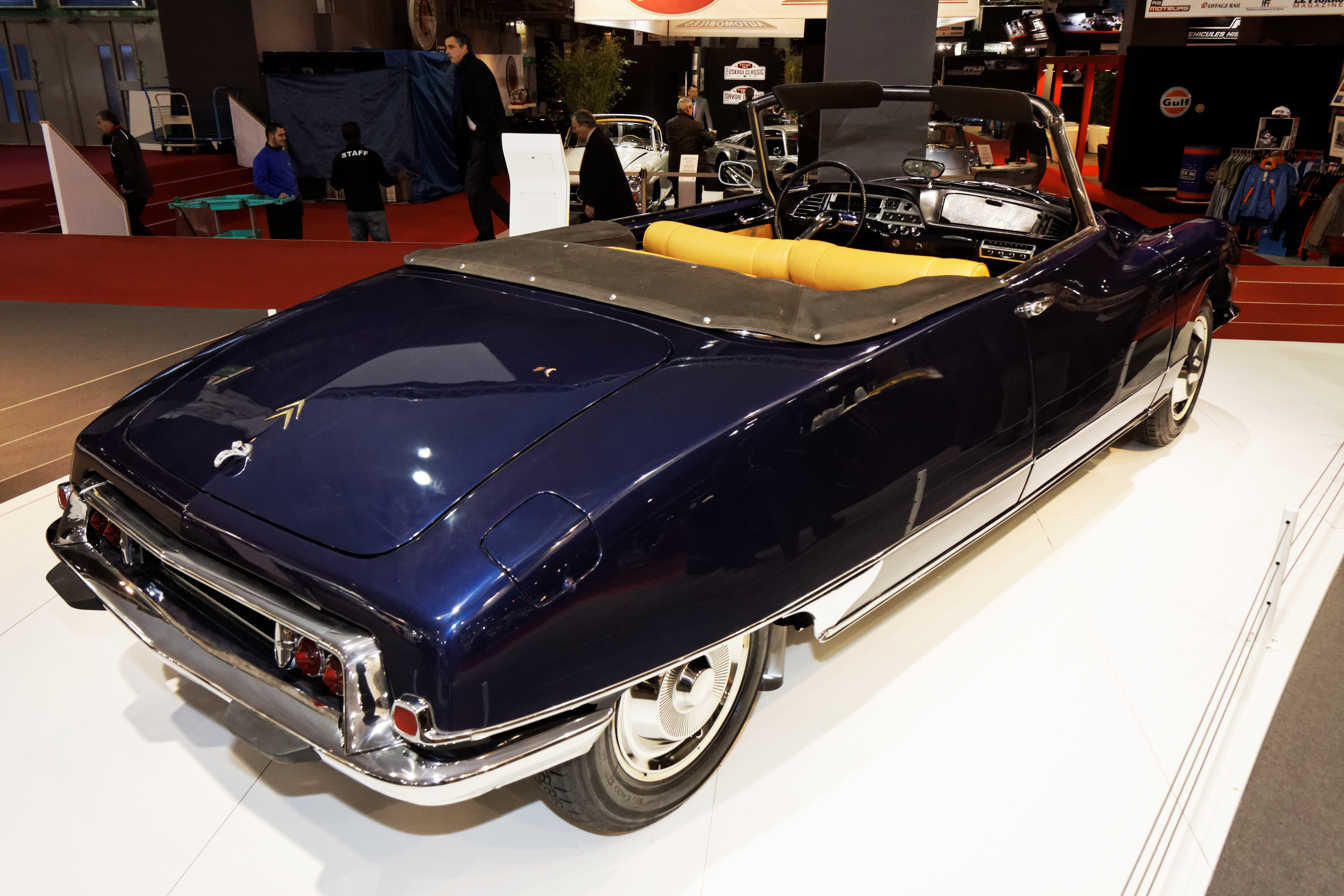
Citroën DS Cabriolet d'Usine (Factory Convertible)

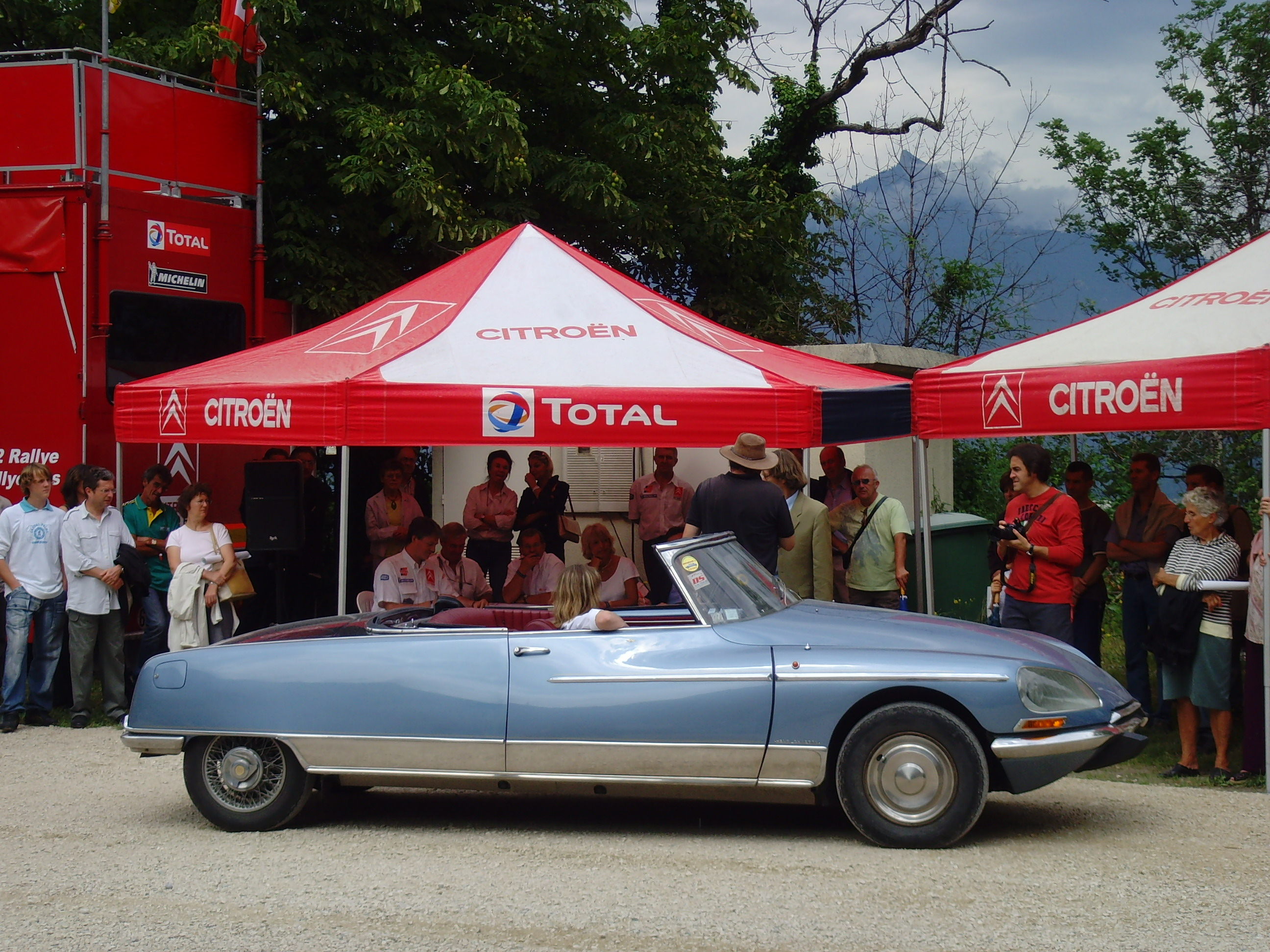
Chapron non-works convertible

=== Pallas ===
In 1965 a luxury upgrade, the DS Pallas (after Greek goddess Pallas Athena), was introduced. This included comfort features such as better noise insulation, a more luxurious (and optional leather) upholstery, and external trim embellishments. From 1966, the Pallas model received a driver's seat with height adjustment.

=== Station wagon, Familiale, and Ambulance ===
A station wagon version was introduced in 1958. It was known by different names in individual markets (Break in France; Safari, and Estate in the UK; Wagon in the US, and Safari and Station-Wagon in Australia). It had a steel roof to support the standard roof rack. 'Familiales' had a rear seat mounted further back in the cabin, with three folding seats between the front and rear squabs. The standard Break had two side-facing seats in the main load area at the back.

The Ambulance configuration was similar to that of the Break, but with a 60/30 split in the rear folding seat to accommodate a stretcher. A 'Commerciale' version was also available for a time.

The Safari saw use as a camera car, notably by the BBC. The hydropneumatic suspension produces an unusually steady platform for filming while driving.

=== Convertible ===
A model "décapotable"convertible was offered from Fall 1960 until Summer 1971. The Cabriolet, model listed as "Décapotable" in Citroën brochures (cabriolet de série) were built by French carrossier Henri Chapron, for the Citroën dealer network. It was an expensive car and only approximately 1,400 units were sold. These DS convertibles used a special frame which was reinforced on the side members and rear suspension swingarm bearing box, similar to, but not identical to the Break (Station Wagon) frame.

Henri Chapron had originally built a convertible on DS 19 for the October 1958 Paris autoshow . At the autoshow, Citroën was so impressed by the Henri Chapron cabriolet design that they approached him asking him if he would agree to build a Citroën "décapotable" (convertible) which would be marketed and commercialized through their dealerships networks. It took 2 years of collaboration between the 2 firms before they could agree on launching a model called "cabriolet de série" by Henri Chapron which was listed as "décapotable" by Citroën. Chapron and Citroën teams worked, hand in hand, on the project. Regular meetings, referenced in memos kept in the Chapron archives, took place both at the Henri Chapron and at the Citroën headquarters. After two years of hard work, the first cabriolet DS 19 “De Série”/ "Décapotable", ordered and commercialized by Citroën, was built, Fall of 1960, at the Henri Chapron factory, 114-116, rue Aristide Briand, Levallois-Perret -92300-. The launching of the cabriolet décapotable took place at the “Pré-Catelan”, route de la Grande Cascade, in the Bois de Boulogne”, in Paris. For approximately ten years, Citroën and Chapron had an agreement: Citroën would order the “cabriolets de série” (4-seated) to Henri Chapron who had them built in his annex, 107-109, rue Aristide Briand, Levallois-Perret -92300-. From then on, the Cabriolet 4 places Chapron on Citroën DS or ID, still ordered and commercialized by Henri Chapron will see its name changed to be called “La Croisette”. Henri Chapron continued to create variants starting from the ID / DS 19 and DS 21 sedan: cabriolets called “Le Caddy” (2-seated) and “Le Palm Beach” (4-seated), coupés called “Le Paris”, “Le Concorde”, “Le Dandy” and “Le Léman”, and sedans called “La Majesty” and “La Lorraine”.

After official production of the décapotable version ended at Citroën at the end of the year-model 1971, end of June 1961, Chapron kept building the "décapotable" version, his "cabriolet de série" on DS 21 and DS 23 platforms and sold it directly to his own customers until 1974.

=== Chapron variations ===
In addition, Chapron also produced and sold his own line on Citroën chassis ID / DS 19, DS 21 and DS 23: a few coupés, called “Le Paris”, “Le Concorde”, “Le Dandy” and “Le Léman”, a few convertibles called “La Croisette”,“Le Caddy” (2-seated) and “Le Palm Beach” (4-seated) and a few sedans called “La Majesty” and “La Lorraine”. He also built special sedans (including the "Prestige", same wheelbase but with a central divider, and the "Lorraine" notchback). Chapron also built the imposing DS Présidentielle in 1967-1968 to a design created by Citroën's design department. This car was 6.53 m (21.4 ft) long, specifically to be longer than the cars used by US Presidents Johnson and Nixon. Ordered directly by President Charles de Gaulle, he did not like the car due to its divider and continued to mainly use either DS landaulets or the two earlier special-bodied Citroën 15/6 H built by Franay and Chapron.

=== Bossaert coupé ===
Between 1959 and 1964, Hector Bossaert produced a coupé on a DS chassis shortened by 470 mm (18 1/2 inches). While the front end remained unchanged, the rear end featured notchback styling.

=== The Reactor ===
In 1965, American auto customizer Gene Winfield created The Reactor, a Citroën DS chassis, with a turbocharged 180 hp (130 kW) flat-six engine from the Corvair driving the front wheels. Since the DS already had the engine behind the front wheels, the longer engine meant only one row of seats. This was draped in a streamlined, low slung, aluminum body.

The Reactor was seen in American television programs of the era, such as Star Trek: The Original Series (episode 54, "Bread and Circuses"), Batman episodes 110 ("Funny Feline Felonies") and 111 (driven by Catwoman Eartha Kitt), and Bewitched, which devoted its episode 3.19 ("Super Car") to The Reactor.

=== Michelin PLR ===
The Michelin PLR is a mobile tyre evaluation machine, based on the DS Break, built in 1972, later used for promotion.

=== Back to the Future Part II taxi ===
For the 1989 film Back to the Future Part II, the producers created a flying car to depict a typical taxi in the future world of 2015. This taxi was based on the DS.

== Technical details ==
=== Suspension ===
In a hydropneumatic suspension system, each wheel is connected, not to a metal spring, but to a hydraulic suspension unit consisting of a hydraulic accumulator sphere of about 12 cm in diameter containing pressurised nitrogen, a cylinder containing hydraulic fluid screwed to the suspension sphere, a piston inside the cylinder connected by levers to the suspension itself, and a damper valve between the piston and the sphere. A membrane in the sphere prevented the nitrogen from escaping. The motion of the wheels translated to a motion of the piston, which acted on the oil in the nitrogen cushion and provided the spring effect. The damper valve took place of the shock absorber in conventional suspensions. The hydraulic cylinder was fed with hydraulic fluid from the main pressure reservoir via a height corrector, a valve controlled by the mid-position of the anti-roll bar connected to the axle. If the suspension was too low, the height corrector introduced high-pressure fluid; if it was too high, it released fluid back to the fluid reservoir. In this manner, a constant ride height was maintained. A control in the cabin allowed the driver to select one of five heights: normal riding height, two slightly higher-riding heights for poor terrain, and two extreme positions for changing wheels. (The correct term, oleopneumatic (oil-air), has never gained widespread use. Hydropneumatic (water-air) continues to be preferred overwhelmingly.)

The DS neither had nor needed a jack to raise the car off the ground. Instead, the hydraulic system enabled wheel changes with the aid of a simple adjustable stand. To change a wheel in the event of a flat tyre, one would adjust the suspension to its topmost setting, insert the stand into a special peg near the flat tyre, then readjust the suspension to its lowermost setting. The flat tyre would then retract upwards and hover above the ground, ready to be changed. This system, used on the SM also, was superseded on the CX by a screw jack that, after the suspension was raised to the high position, lifted the tyre clear of the ground. The DS system, while impressive to use, sometimes dropped the car quite suddenly, especially if the stand was not placed precisely or the ground was soft or unlevel.

=== Source and reserve of pressure ===
The central part of the hydraulic system was the high-pressure pump, which maintained a pressure of between 13 and 15 MPa; 1,900 and 2,200 psi (130 and 150 bar) in two accumulators. These accumulators were very similar in construction to the suspension spheres. One was dedicated to the front brakes, and the other ran the other hydraulic systems. (On the simpler ID models, the front brakes operated from the main accumulator.) Thus in case of a hydraulic failure, the first indication would be that the steering became heavy, followed by the gearbox not working; only later would the brakes fail.

Two different hydraulic pumps were used. The DS used a seven-cylinder axial piston pump driven off two belts and delivering 17.5 MPa; 2,540 psi (175 bar) of pressure. The ID19, with its simpler hydraulic system, had a single-cylinder pump driven by an eccentric on the camshaft.

=== Gearbox and clutch ===
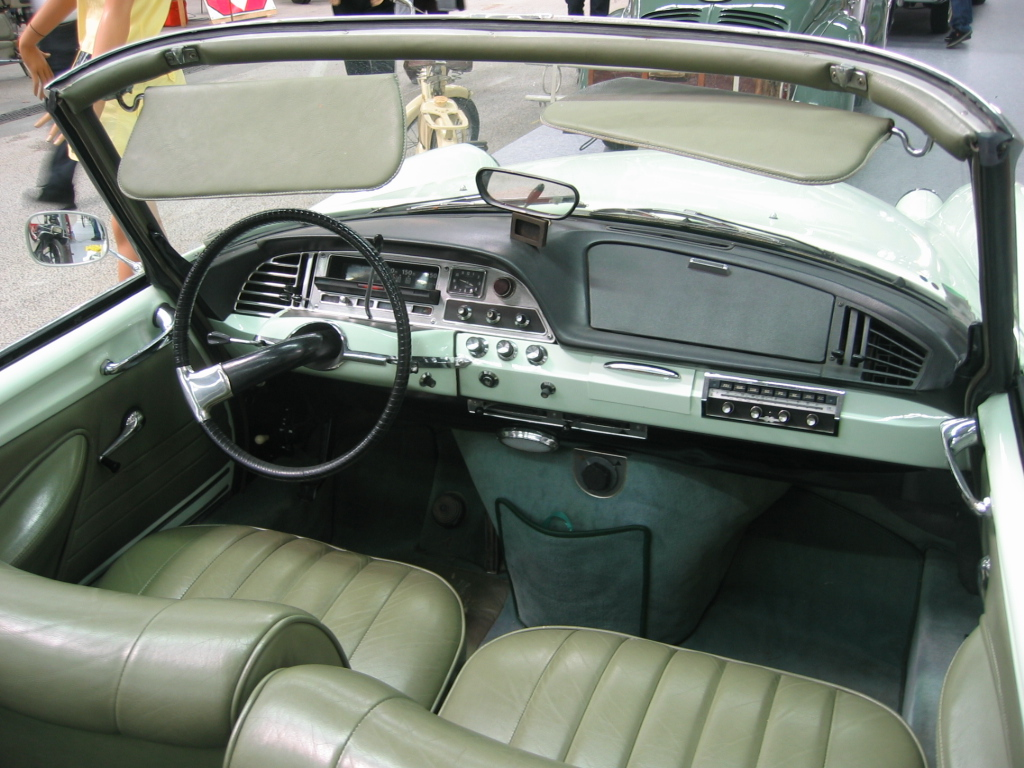
Mid-1960s interior

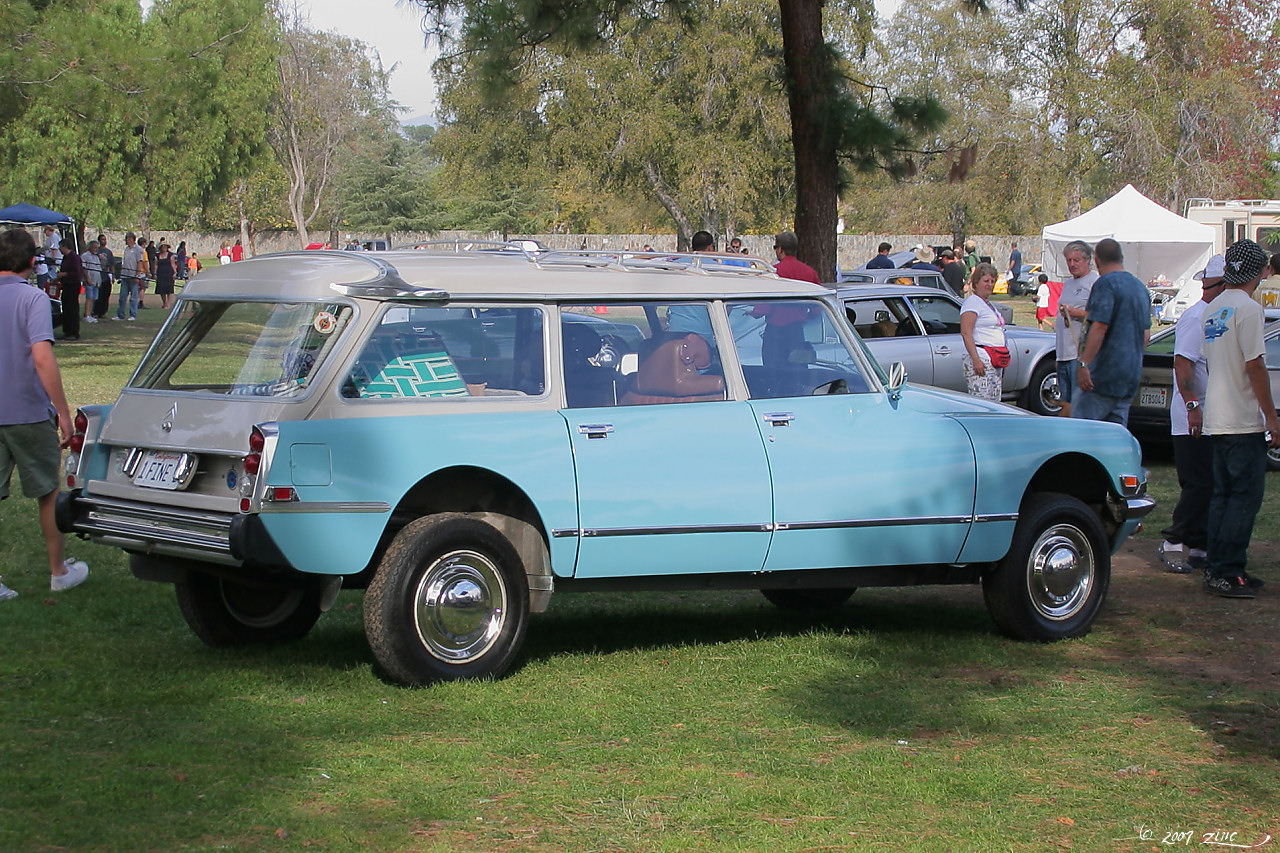
1972 D Wagon in high suspension setting

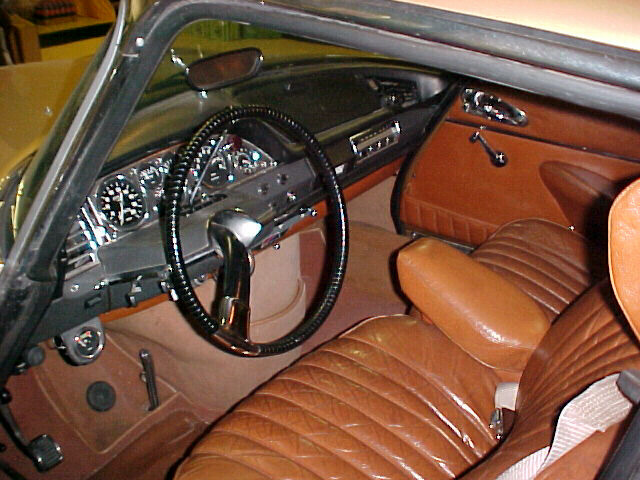
1969 Pallas interior with Hydraulic gear selector – mounted top right of steering column with unusual single spoke steering wheel (a safety feature as the curved and off-center spoke will deflect the driver away from the steering column in a crash.). Note the "mushroom" brake pedal. (The pedal on the left is the parking brake)

==== Hydraulique or Citromatic ====
The DS was initially offered only with the Hydraulique four-speed semi-automatic (B.V.H.—Boîte de Vitesses Hydraulique) gearbox.

This was a four-speed gearbox and clutch, operated by a hydraulic controller. To change gears, the driver flicked a lever behind the steering wheel to the next position and eased-up on the accelerator pedal. The hydraulic controller disengaged the clutch, disengaged the previous gear, then engaged the nominated gear, and re-engaged the clutch. The speed of engagement of the clutch was controlled automatically, responding to hydraulic sensing of engine rpm and the position of the butterfly valve in the carburetor (i.e., the position of the accelerator), and the brake circuit. When the brake was pressed, the engine idle speed dropped to an rpm below the clutch engagement speed, thus preventing friction while stopped in gear at traffic lights. When the brake was released, the idle speed increased to the clutch dragging speed. The car would then creep forward much like automatic transmission cars. This drop-in idle throttle position also caused the car to have more engine drag when the brakes were applied even before the car slowed to the idle speed in gear, preventing the engine from pulling against the brakes. In the event of loss of hydraulic pressure (following a loss of system fluid), the clutch would disengage, to prevent driving, while brake pressure reserves would allow safe braking to a standstill.

Unlike an automatic transmission, there is no Park position on the transmission where the wheels are locked. In addition, the hydraulic clutch would disengage with the engine stopped, so the car could not be left in gear when parked. The only way to prevent the car from rolling (for example, if parked on a slope) is to use the parking brake.

==== Manual—four-speed and five-speed ====
The later and simpler ID19 had the same gearbox and clutch, manually operated. This configuration was offered as a cheaper option for the DS in 1963. The mechanical aspects of the gearbox and clutch were completely conventional and the same elements were used in the ID 19. In September 1970, Citroën introduced a five-speed manual gearbox, in addition to the original four-speed unit. All manual transmissions used a steering column-mounted shifter.

==== Fully-automatic ====
In September 1971 Citroën introduced a 3-speed fully-automatic Borg-Warner 35 transmission gearbox, on the DS 21 and later DS 23 models. The fully automatic transmission DS was never sold in the US market where this type of transmission had gained market share so quickly that it became the majority of the market by this time. Many automatic DSs, fuel-injected DS 23 sedans with air conditioning, were sold in Australia.

=== Engines ===
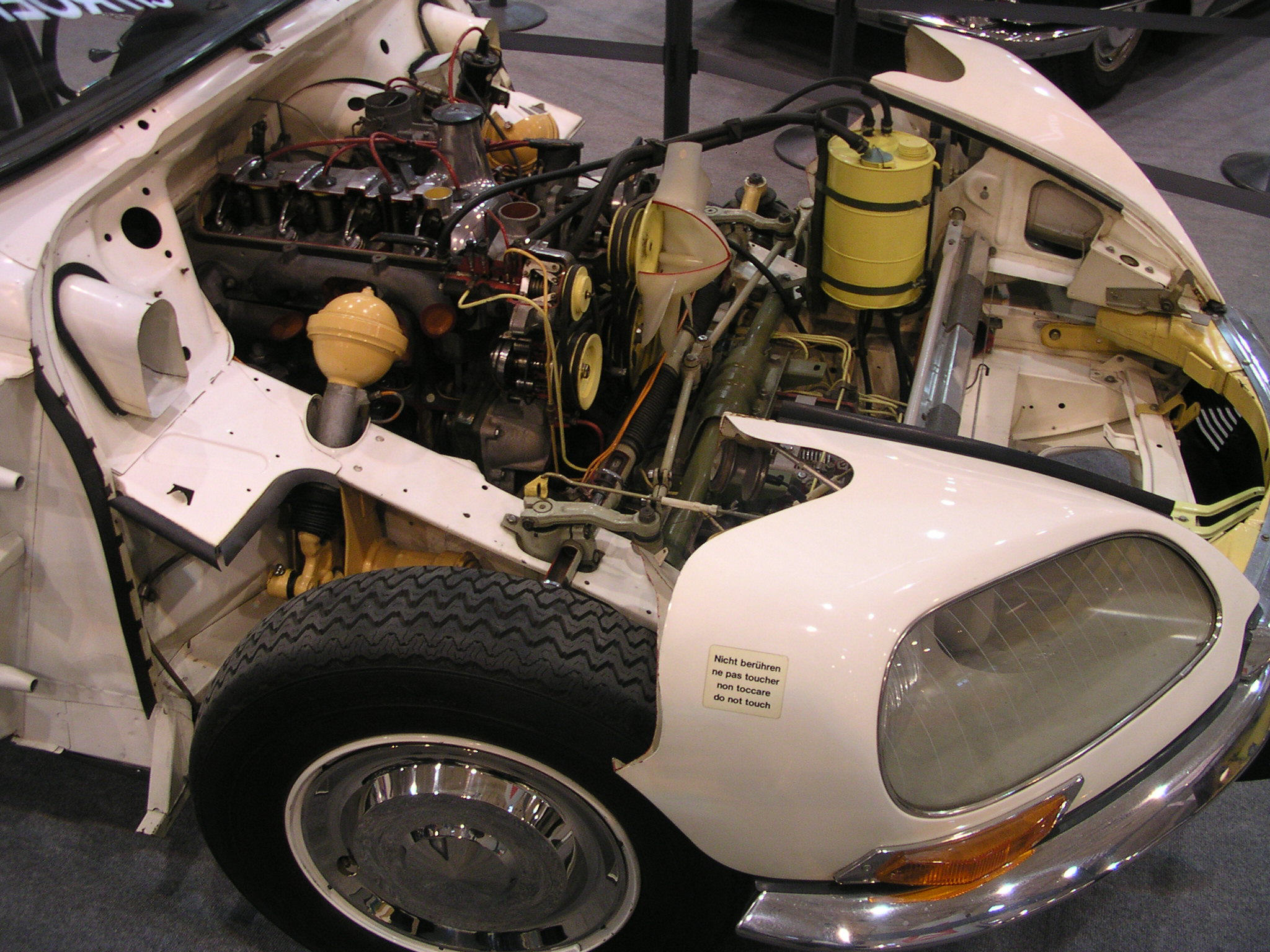
Cutaway model shows engine set far back from front wheels ("MF layout"), and partially reveals configuration of the oleopneumatic suspension

The DS was originally designed around an air-cooled flat-six based on the design of the 2-cylinder engine of the 2CV, similar to the motor in the Porsche 911. Technical and monetary problems forced this idea to be scrapped.

Thus, for such a modern car, the engine of the original DS 19 was old-fashioned. It was derived from the engine of the 11CV Traction Avant (models 11B and 11C). It was an OHV four-cylinder engine with three main bearings and wet liners, and a bore of 78 mm (3.1 in) and a stroke of 100 mm (3.9 in), giving a volumetric displacement of 1911 cc. The cylinder head had been reworked; the 11C had a reverse-flow cast iron cylinder head and generated 60 hp (45 kW) at 3800 rpm; by contrast, the DS 19 had an aluminium cross-flow head with hemispherical combustion chambers and generated 75 hp (56 kW) at 4500 rpm.

Like the Traction Avant, the DS had the gearbox mounted in front of the engine, with the differential in between. Thus some consider the DS to be a mid engine front-wheel drive car.

The DS and ID engines evolved throughout their 20-year production run. The car was underpowered and faced constant mechanical changes to boost the performance of the four-cylinder engine. The initial 1911 cc three main bearing engine (carried forward from the Traction Avant) of the DS 19 was replaced in 1965 with the 1985 cc five-bearing wet-cylinder motor, becoming the DS 19a (called DS 20 from September 1969).

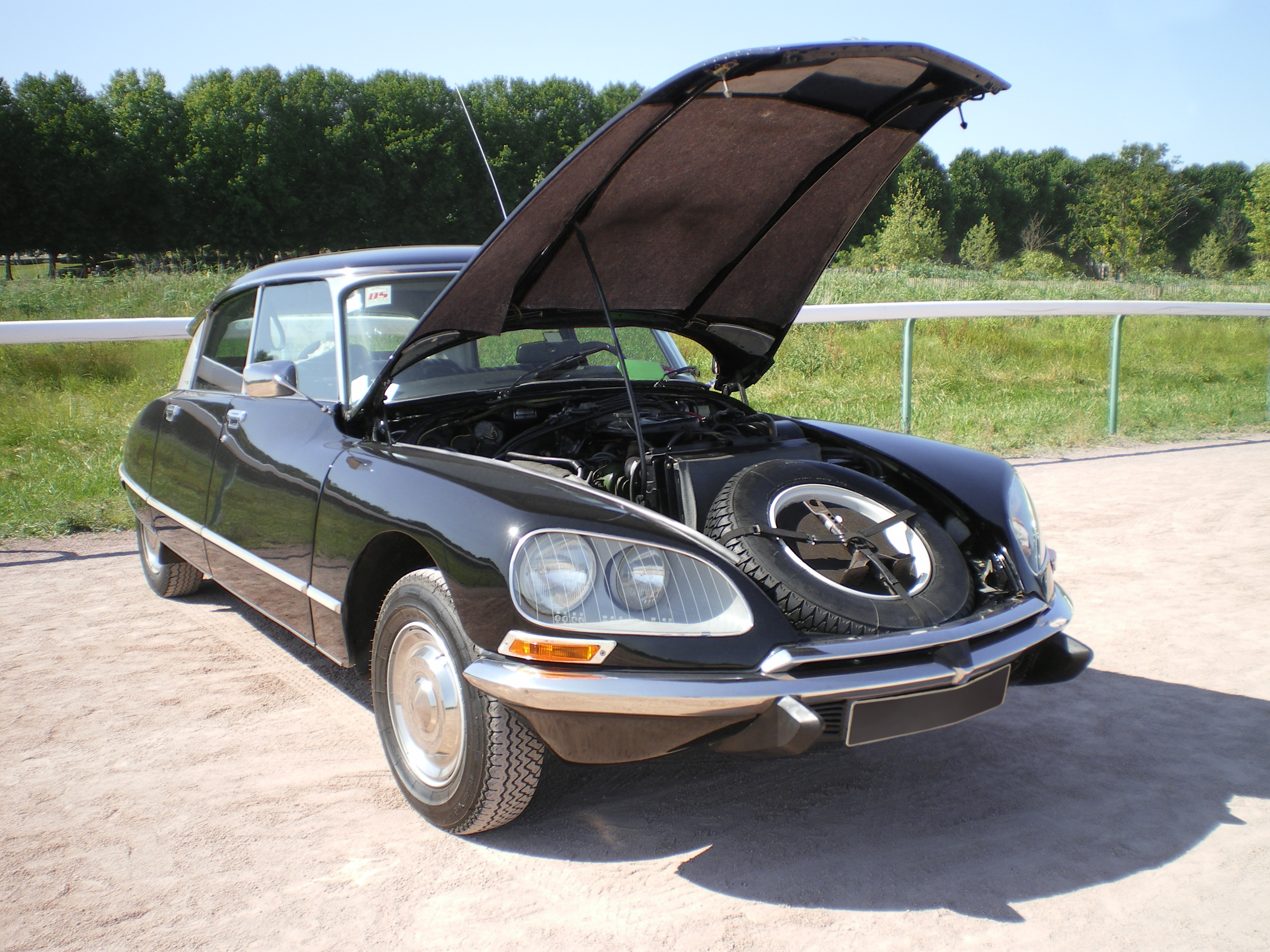
Spare tyre, mounted under the hood

The DS 21 was also introduced for model year 1965. This was a 2175 cc, five main bearing engine; power was 106 hp DIN This engine received a substantial increase in power with the introduction of Bosch electronic fuel injection for 1970, making the DS one of the first mass-market cars to use electronic fuel injection. Power of the carbureted version also increased slightly at the same time, owing to the employment of larger inlet valves.

Lastly, 1973 saw the introduction of the 2347 cc 115 hp (86 kW; 115 hp) engine of the DS 23 in both carbureted and fuel-injected forms. The DS 23 with electronic fuel injection was the most powerful production model, producing 141 hp (105 kW) SAE (130 hp DIN).

IDs and their variants went through a similar evolution, generally lagging the DS by about one year. ID saloon models never received the DS 23 engine or fuel injection, although the Break/Familiale versions received the carburetted version of the DS 23 engine when it was introduced, supplemented the DS20 Break/Familiale.

The top of the range ID model, The DSuper5 (DP) gained the DS21 engine (the only model that this engine was retained in) for the 1973 model year and it was mated to a five-speed gearbox. This should not be confused with the 1985 cc DSuper fitted with an optional "low ratio" five-speed gearbox, or with the previous DS21M (DJ) five-speed.

== In popular culture ==
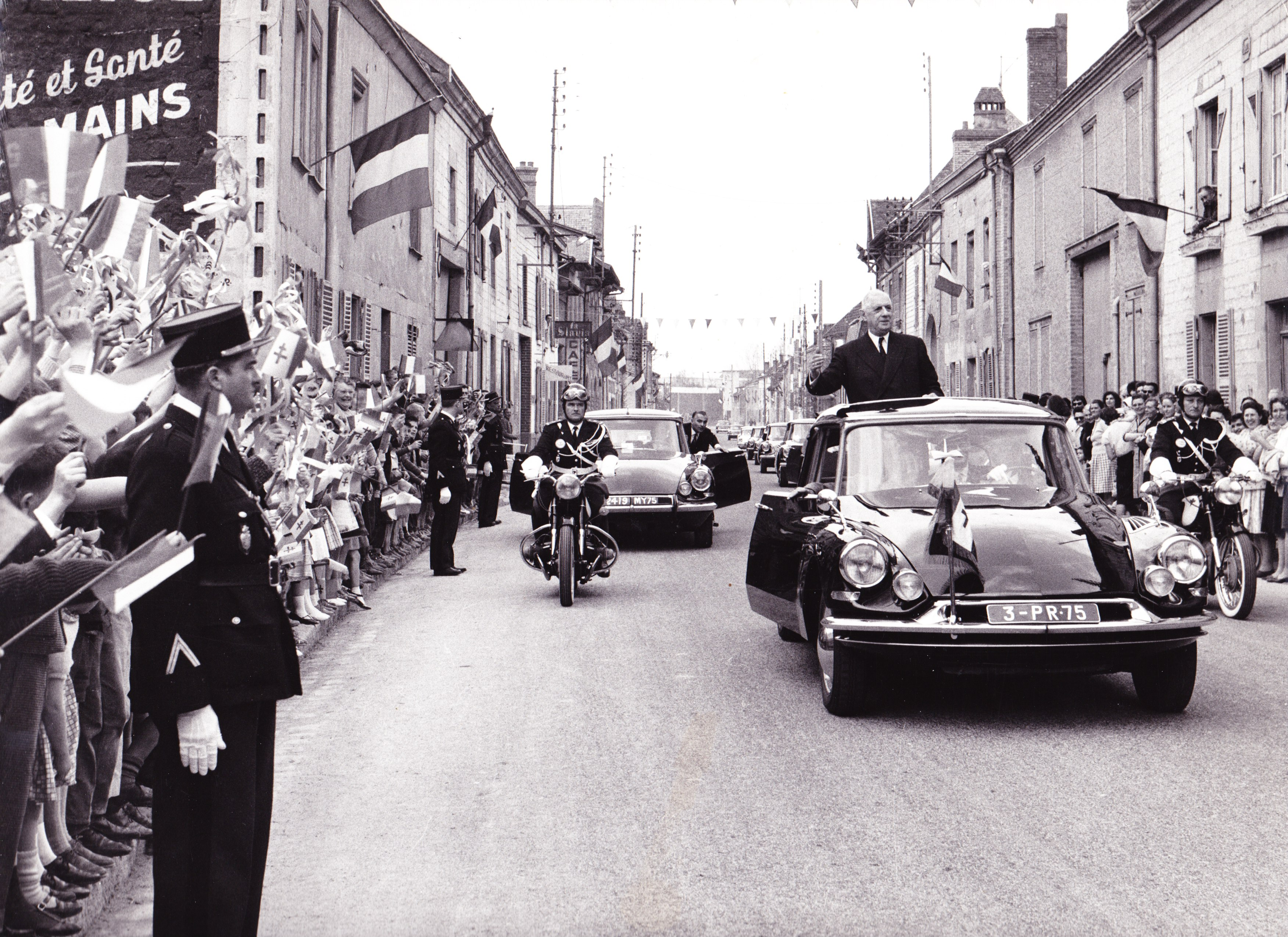
Général Charles de Gaulle visits Isles-sur-Suippe (Marne) in 1963

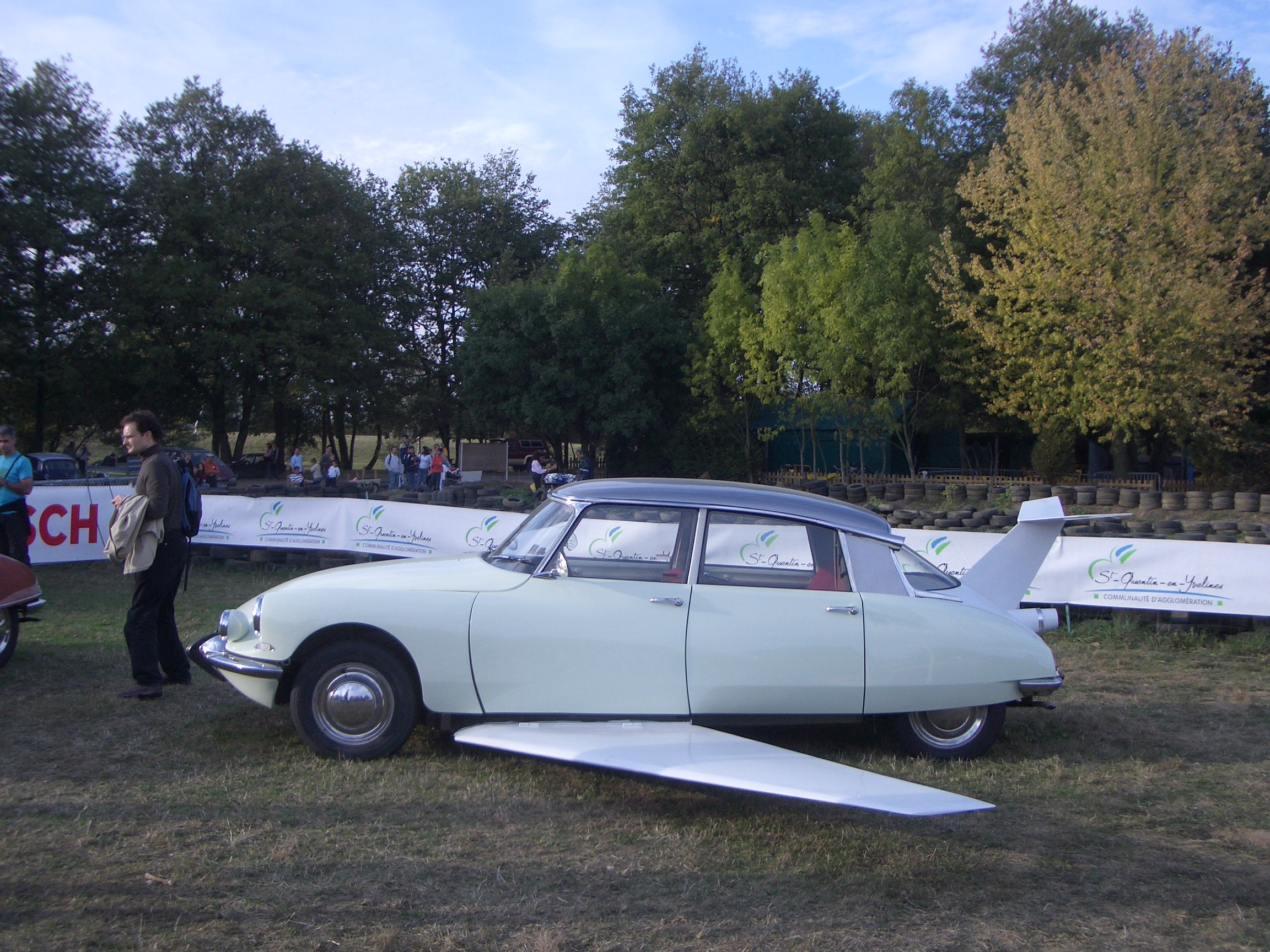
Flying DS from Fantômas

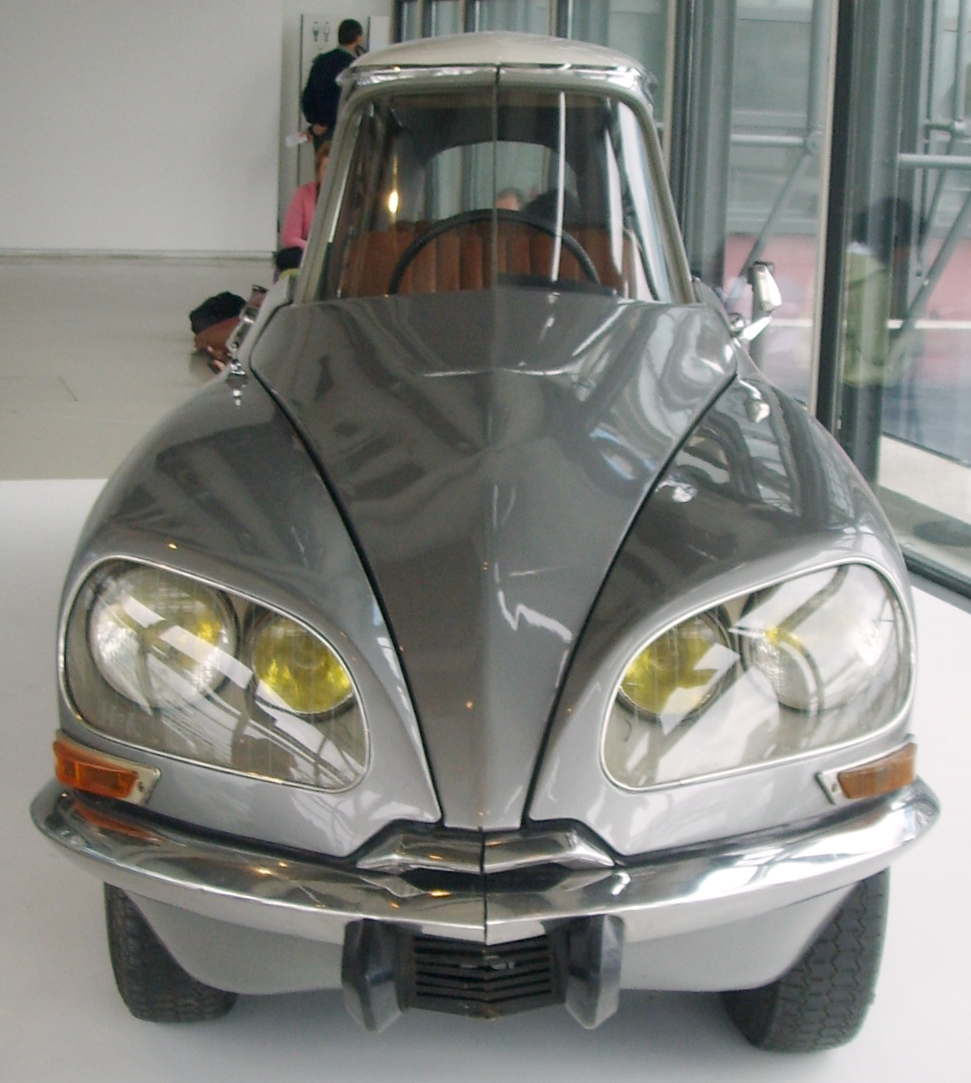
La DS 1993 Sculpture by Gabriel Orozco, exhibited at Museum of Modern Art

President Charles de Gaulle survived an assassination attempt at Le Petit-Clamart near Paris on 22 August 1962, planned by Algerian War veteran Jean-Marie Bastien-Thiry. The plan was to ambush the motorcade with machine guns, disable the vehicles, and then close in for the kill. De Gaulle praised the unusual abilities of his unarmoured Citroën DS, which saved his life – the car, riddled with bullets and with two tyres punctured, was still able to escape at full speed. Afterward, De Gaulle vowed never to ride in any other make of car. This event was recreated in the film The Day of the Jackal (1973).

The 1961 Citroën DS 19 Décapotable Usine by Henri Chapron garnered publicity for the new model, from its prominent film placement, when Cary Grant himself "telephoned the French automotive company, Citroën, to order a new car for use in the film That Touch of Mink (1962)."

The car the eponymous villain uses in the 1965 French comedy Fantômas se déchaîne is a modified, flying Citroën DS.

Gabriel Orozco's sculpture, "La DS" (1993), is a commentary on automotive design and the fetishization of speed. The artwork is a modified Citroën DS automobile, which was created by the artist and his assistant over a month in a Parisian garage. Orozco cut the car in half lengthwise, removed the central one-third section, and re-welded the remaining two-thirds back together. The result is a dramatically slimmed-down vehicle that can only fit one person and is immobile. The sculpture exaggerates the Citroën DS's already sleek, aerodynamic lines, pushing its streamlined form to an absurd extreme. Orozco subverts the purpose of an automobile by eliminating a third of the car's width and rendering it useless for transportation. The car's engine, lights, and other components are intact but non-functional. He transforms a symbol of mobility, speed, and modern design into an immobile, sculptural object. The piece isolates and emphasizes the car's formal beauty, creating an almost poetic image of sleekness and speed that is, paradoxically, completely static.

== Legacy ==
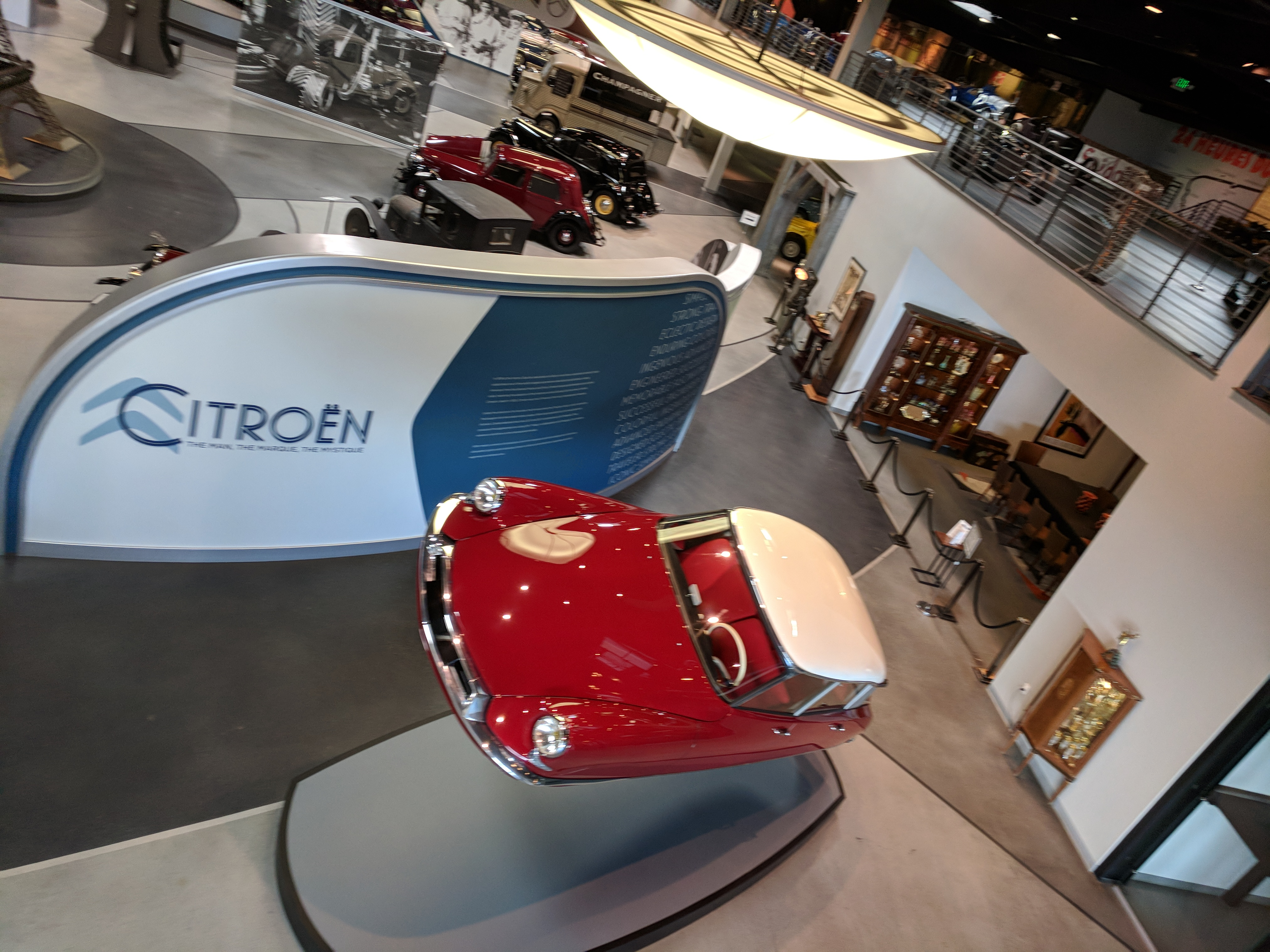
Flying DS shown during Citroën cars exhibition at Mullin Automotive Museum 2018

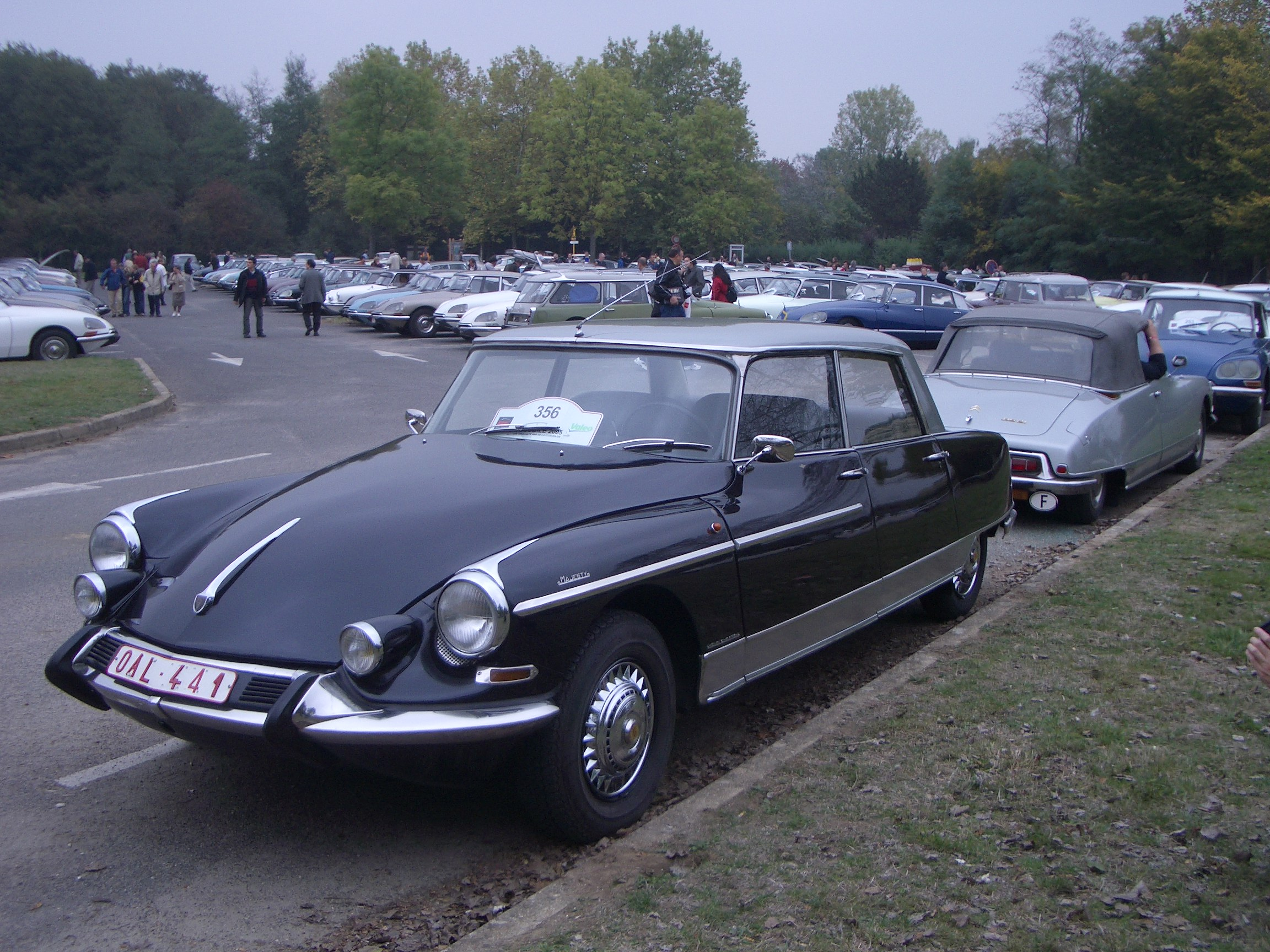
Henri Chapron's Lorraine model at 2005 Paris meeting

Citroën DS values have been rising – a 1973 DS 23 Injection Electronique "Decapotable" (Chapron Convertible) sold for €176250 ($209738) at Christie's Rétromobile in February 2006. A similar car sold by Bonhams in February 2009 brought €343497 ($440436). On 18 September 2009 a 1966 DS21 Decapotable Usine was sold by Bonhams for a hammer price of £131300. Bonhams sold another DS21 Decapotable (1973) on 23 January 2010 for €189000.

Citroën was the featured exhibit at the Mullin Automotive Museum for the year 2017/8, and the DS made its first appearance on the lawn at the Pebble Beach Concours d'Elegance in 2018.

The DS's place in French society was demonstrated in Paris on 9 October 2005 with a celebration of the 50th anniversary of its launch. 1600 DS cars drove in procession past the Arc de Triomphe.

In 2009, Groupe PSA created a new brand – DS Automobiles, intended as high quality, high specification variations on existing models, with differing mechanics and bodywork. This brand was introduced in three models, the DS 3, DS 4, and the DS 5. The DS 3, launched in March 2010, is based on Citroën's new C3, but is more customisable and unique, bearing some resemblance to the original DS, with its "Shark Fin" side pillar.

== Production figures ==
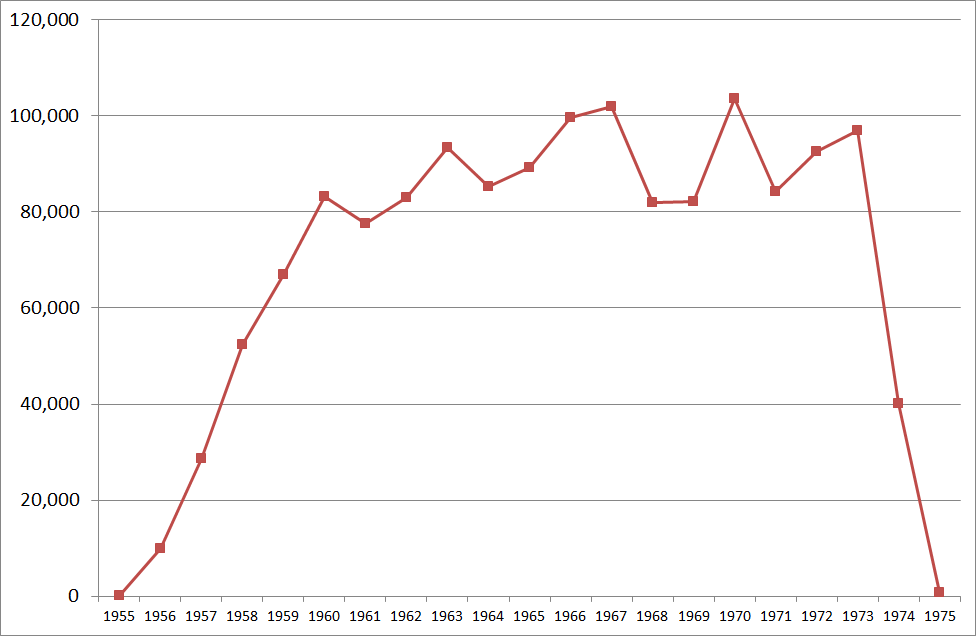
Citroën DS production chart

- 1955: 69
- 1956: 9868
- 1957: 28593
- 1958: 52416
- 1959: 66931
- 1960: 83205
- 1961: 77597
- 1962: 83035
- 1963: 93476
- 1964: 85379
- 1965: 89314
- 1966: 99561
- 1967: 101904
- 1968: 81860
- 1969: 82218
- 1970: 103633
- 1971: 84328
- 1972: 92483
- 1973: 96990
- 1974: 40039
- 1975: 847

== See also ==
- Road & Track magazine, USA. November 1956.
- Road & Track magazine, USA. June 1958.
- Tatra 77

== Technical literature in Further reading ==
The restoration, maintenance and repair of the Citroën DS have been covered by several workshop manuals and technical publications, including:

- Citroën 19, 20, 21, 23 Owners Workshop Manual 1955-1975. Brooklands Books. ISBN 978-1-85520-070-8.
- Reynolds, John. Original Citroën DS. Herridge & Sons. ISBN 978-1-906133-83-2.
- Art de la Rénovation (2026). Restore a Citroën DS. Independently Published. ISBN 979-8188479602.
