= Michelin PLR =

Tire evaluation test car

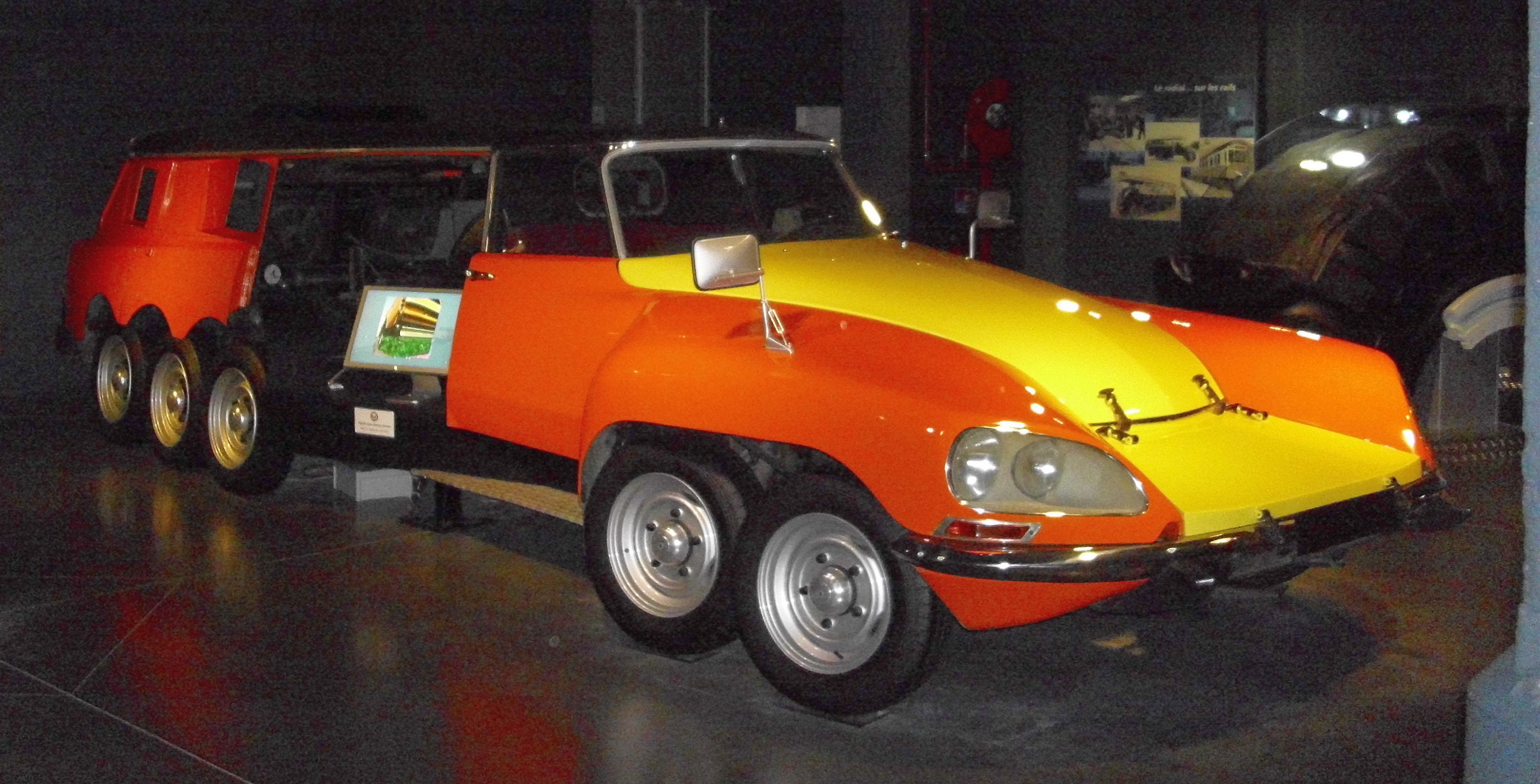
The PLR in the Michelin Corporation Museum L’Aventure Michelin

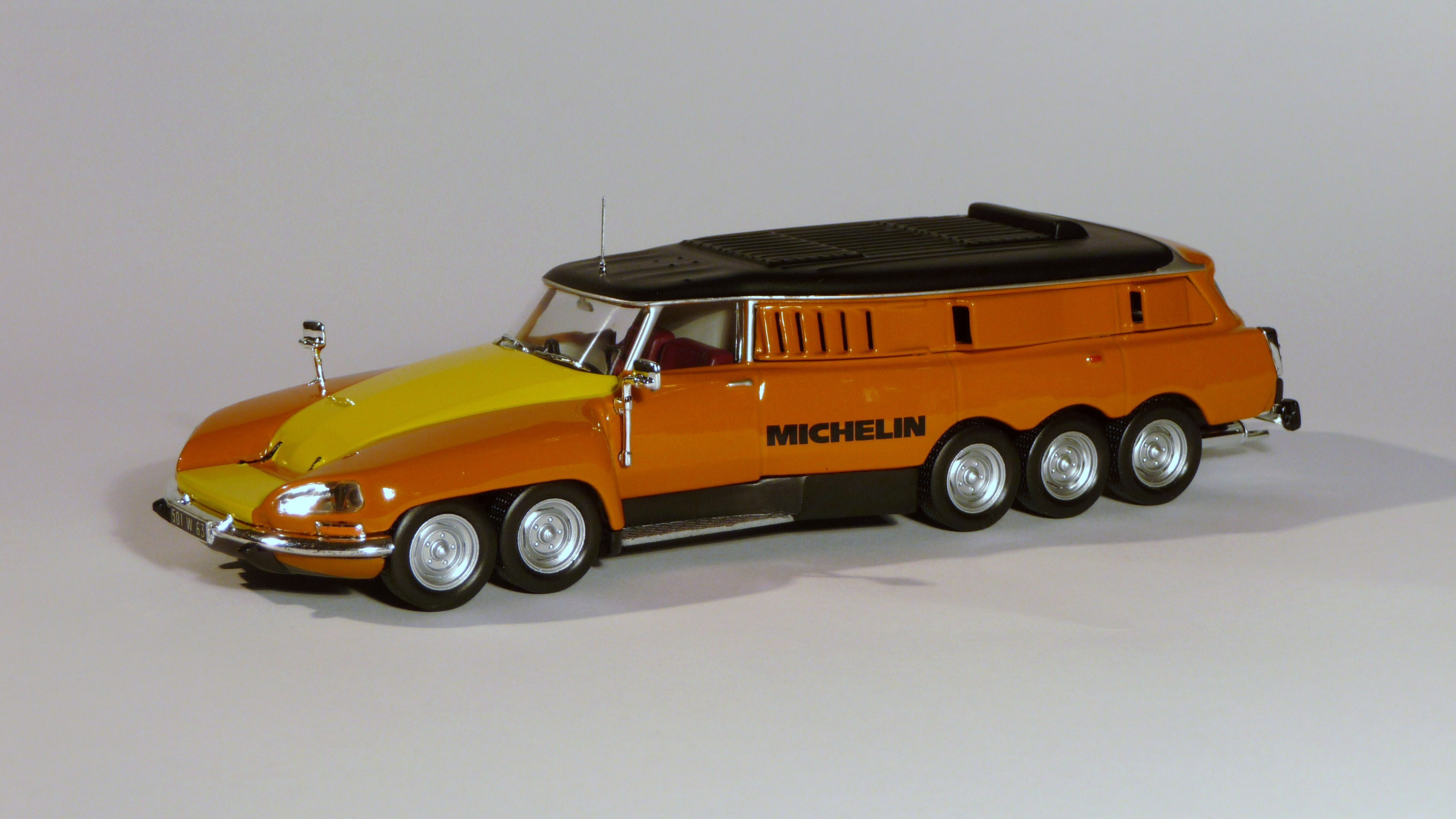
A 1:43 scale PLR model car

The Michelin PLR, internal name Citroën DS PLR Break, Poids Lourd Rapide [Break] means "fast heavyweight" [Station wagon], nicknamed as Mille Pattes, the French word for centipede, is a tire evaluation test car. The single-item based on a Citroën DS Break., built in 1972 by French tire manufacturer Michelin, when Michelin was a shareholder of car manufacturer Citroën. The PLR was used on the Test Track Ladoux, in Clermont-Ferrand. Michelin no longer uses the vehicle for evaluation, but instead as promotional vehicle at fairs and exhibitions. Most of the time, it is parked in the Michelin Museum in Clermont-Ferrand.

== Construction ==
The ten-wheeler uses the hydropneumatic suspension design, based on the Citroën DS platform. The steering controls all the four front wheels. Tyres to wheel hubs are parts of the Citroën H Van.

Two 350 Chevrolet Small-Block engines are installed in the tail of the PLR, one for driving the vehicle, the other driving the sample tyre, located in the middle of the PLR. Air intake for cooling the engines are located both sides of the PLR, windows had been replaced by grids.

The PLR is 2.45 meters (8.0 ft) wide and 7.2 meters (24 ft) long. Installed lead raised the weight to 9.5 metric tons (21,000 lb). In the center part of the stretched vehicle, the sample tyre unit is installed. Controlled by hydraulics, the sample can be lowered and aligned in various positions. Evaluating tyres for commercial vehicles was feasible. The PLR reaches up to 180 kilometers per hour (110 mph) top speed. Two fuel tanks are installed, 90 liters (24 U.S. gal) each.

== Literature ==
- Björn Marek and Immo Mikloweit: Citroën DS. Das Leben einer Göttin. Komet Verlag, Köln, ISBN 978-3-86941-202-3, P. 82–85 (German)
