= Classic & Sports Car =

British magazine

- Cover of the December 2024 issue
- Categories: Classic cars
- Frequency: Monthly
- Circulation: 60,102 (2017)
- Publisher: Haymarket Media Group
- First issue: April 1982
- Country: UK
- Based in: Twickenham, London
- Language: English
- Website: http://www.classicandsportscar.com/
- ISSN: 0263-3183

Classic & Sports Car is a British monthly magazine based in Twickenham, London, and published by Haymarket Media Group. It was launched in April 1982 and concerns itself with classic cars as well as the people involved in their design and subsequent use, including in period motorsport. The magazine offers a combination of road test features, buying advice, product tests, book reviews and features on automotive artists, plus event and auction coverage. It deals primarily with older and more prestigious or sporting (and hence more expensive) models of car.

The magazine recognises "clubs and individuals who do most to inspire their fellow enthusiasts" by means of the annual Classic & Sports Car Club Awards.

As well as being well established in its UK home, the magazine has wide news stand distribution in the US, from where a number of the cars featured come. Many US classic car dealers join those from Britain and Europe in advertising in the magazine. Since April 2008, Classic & Sports Car has been available in France, published by Fink-Presse France.
