= André Lefèbvre =

French automobile engineer (1894-1964)

- Lefèbvre in 1924
- Born: August 19, 1894; Louvres, Val-d'Oise, France
- Died: May 4, 1964 (aged 69); Saint-Germain-en-Laye, France
- Education: ISAE-SUPAERO
- Occupation: Automobile engineer

André Lefèbvre (19 August 1894 – 4 May 1964) was a French automobile engineer.

André René Lefèbvre was born in Louvres, France (North of Paris, Val d'Oise). He began his career as an aviation engineer working for Voisin, then later for Renault and Citroën. He was also a racing driver and racing car designer.

After studying at Supaéro, he began to work for Gabriel Voisin in March 1916. Voisin placed Lefebvre in charge of his Laboratoire where he worked, until the end of World War I, on aviation projects and then automobiles. He is particularly noted for creating the Voisin C6 Laboratoire, which was a racing car prepared for the 1923 French Grand Prix.

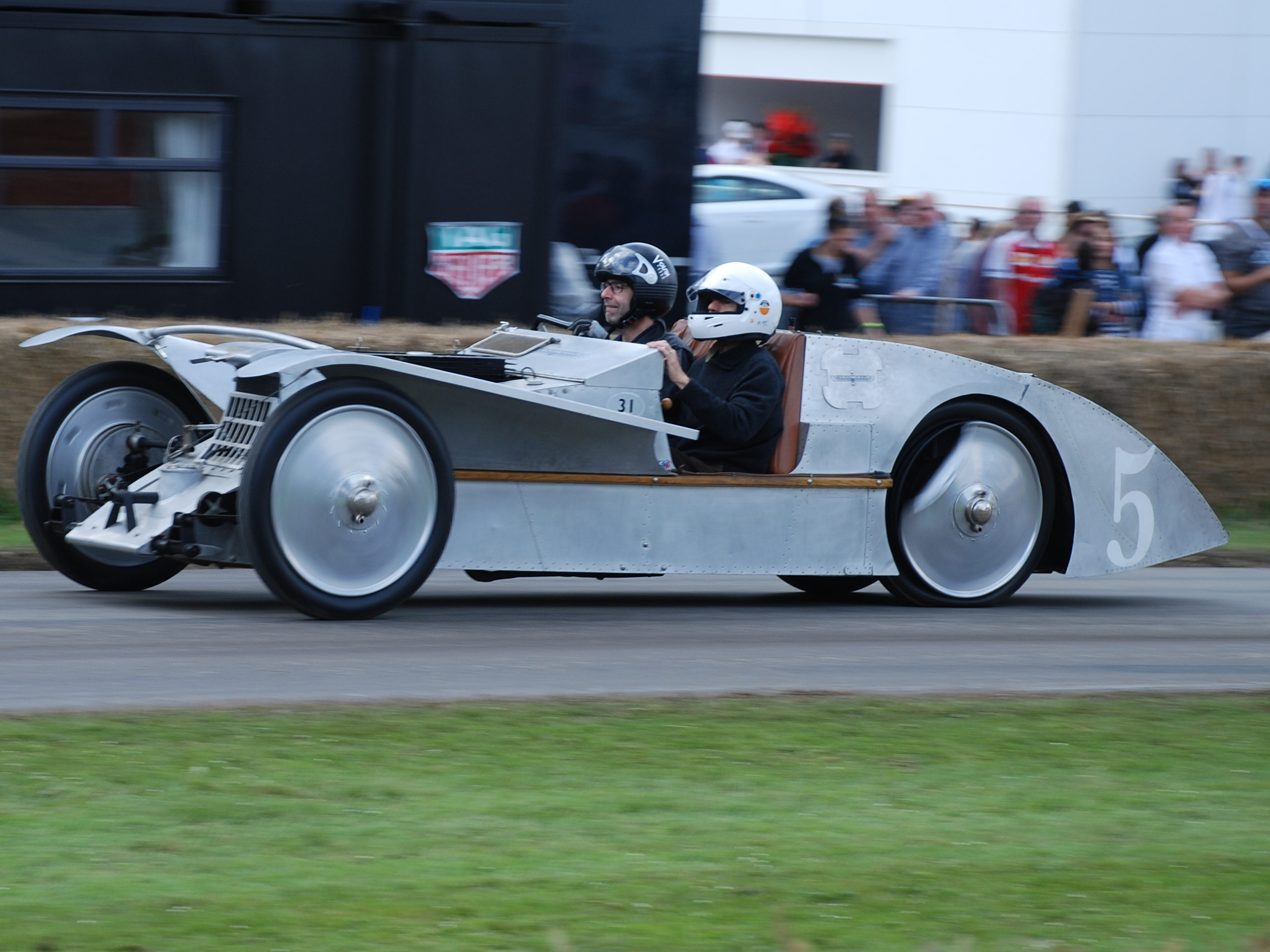
Voisin C6 Laboratoire

When Voisin ran into business problems in 1931 (during the Great Depression), Lefèbvre was recommended to Louis Renault. Renault was persuaded to recruit Lefèbvre by François Lehideux, himself a senior executive within the company (who was also married to the daughter of Renault's brother).

Lefèbvre remained with Renault until 1933, when he was hired by André Citroën to work on the Traction Avant project. After the death of André Citroën in July 1935, Lefèbvre continued his work at Citroën, now led by the innovative entrepreneur Pierre-Jules Boulanger, who came to the company from Michelin.

Working with Citroën designers Flaminio Bertoni and Paul Magès, Lefèbvre created four vehicles during 20th century:

- Citroën Traction Avant (1934–1957) – a large family sedan, a favourite of gangsters, the French resistance and the Gestapo, built for 23 years
- Citroën 2CV (1948–1990) – a small, advanced, utility sedan, known as "the duck" or "Tin Snail", built for 42 years
- Citroën DS (1955–1975) – a radically advanced, large family sedan, seen as shark like, built for 20 years
- Citroën HY (1947–1981) – in corrugated steel sheet, practical delivery van, built for 34 years

The 1955 Citroën DS placed third in the 1999 Car of the Century competition, behind the Ford Model T and BMC Mini.

Lefèbvre died of hemiplegia on 4 May 1964.
