= Sensaud de Lavaud =

The Dimitri Sensaud de Lavaud was a French automobile manufactured between 1926 and 1928. An unusual car, made in Paris by M. Dimitri Sensaud de Lavaud, a Brazilian, it had an automatic transmission. The Alpax chassis was cast alloy, and it was powered by a steam-cooled 5475 cc six-cylinder engine of American origin. Few were built.

The automatic transmission did not select between several gears - instead, it relied solely on the converter's torque multiplication (like GM's much later Dynaflow).

André Citroën had intended to use a gearbox based on Sensaud de Lavaud's principles in his 1934-launched Citroën Traction Avant 7A, but it proved impossible for his engineers to make the car's 1300cc engine - coupled with Sensaud de Lavaud's invention - accelerate the vehicle and maintain acceptable speeds uphill, so the 7A appeared with a conventional 3-speed unit.

== Bibliography ==
- CERF, Alain. Dimitri Sensaud de Lavaud – Un ingénieur extraordinaire. Nîmes (França): Editions du Palmier, 2009. ISBN 2-36059-000-6
- CERF, Alain. Dimitri Sensaud de Lavaud – An extraordinary engineer. Pinellas Park, Florida (USA): Tampa Bay Automobile Museum, 2010.
