= Citroën Rosalie =

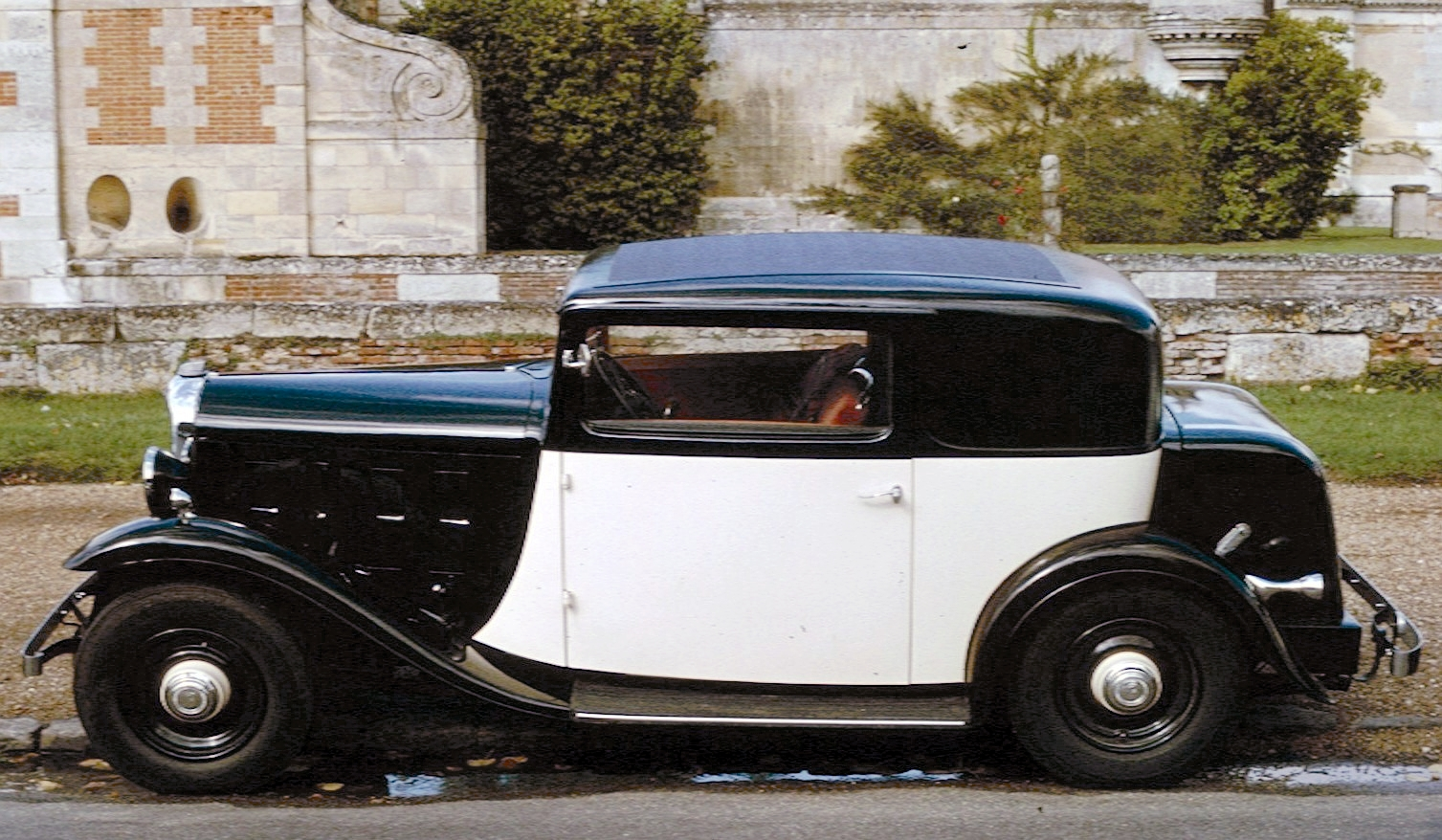

Overview
- Manufacturer: Citroën
- Production: 1932–1938; 8CV: 38,835; 10CV: 49,249; 15CV: ca 25,000
- Assembly: France: Paris

Body and chassis
- Class: Executive car (E)
- Body style: 4-door sedan
- Layout: FR layout

Powertrain
- Engine: 1,452 cc (88.6 cu in) I4 (8CV); 1,767 cc (107.8 cu in) I4 (10CV); 2,650 cc (162 cu in) I6 (15CV)
- Transmission: 3-speed manual

Dimensions
- Length: 4,270 mm (168.1 in) (8CV); 4,570 mm (179.9 in) (10CV); 4,720 mm (185.8 in) (15CV)

Chronology
- Predecessor: Citroën C4 & C6
- Successor: Traction Avant

The original Citroën Rosalie was a light-weight racing car that established a succession of records at the Montlhéry racing circuit. More generally the Rosalie was a range of three models/sizes of automobile that comprised the core of Citroën's model range between 1932 and 1938. The three models were originally designated respectively the 8CV, the 10CV, and the 15CV, the numbers indicating the cars' fiscal horsepower which in turn defined the approximate engine size of each model. After the introduction of the new Traction Avant, the lineup was modified and at the 1934 Paris Salon the two smaller models became the 7UA and the 11UA, now with the overhead-valve engines from the Traction. Starting with the 1933 model year Citroen offered the 1,766 cc 11UD diesel engine option.

== Chronology ==
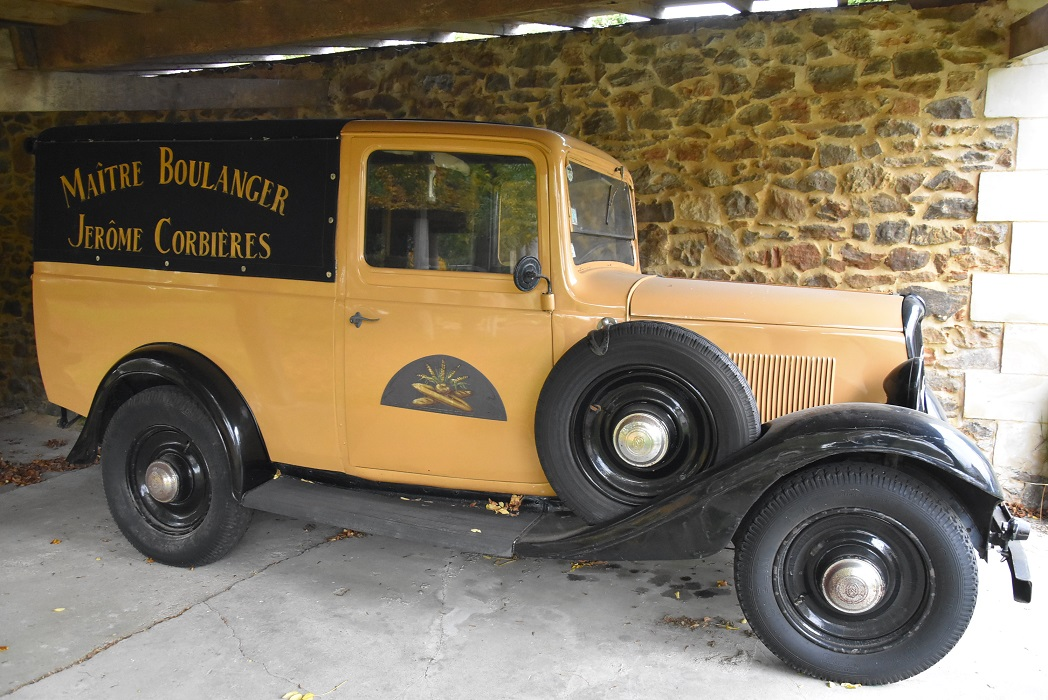
Rosalie 1936 - Utility vehicle that appeared in a 1993 French television series about bakeries.

At introduction, the larger Rosalies replaced the Citroëns C4 and C6, themselves launched respectively in 1928 and 1929. They also represented a move upmarket for the entire business, since during the early 1930s Citroën appeared for a time to lose interest in the smaller cars which had filled their dealerships during the 1920s. The Rosalies, especially the larger 15CV versions, were offered with range of different body types: this was normal practice at the time. Though not radical in terms of subsequent Citroën launches, the look of the Rosalies was significantly more modern than that of the earlier C4 and C6 models. However, the real revolution at Citroën during these years involved production technology. André Citroën had drawn practical inspiration from his 1912 visit to Henry Ford's then new Highland Park Ford Plant in Michigan, and in 1932 Citroën was still a European leader in the application of assembly line manufacturing. Rosalies were competitively but apparently profitably priced.

In 1934 all the Rosalies received a facelift which involved applying a gently raked angle to the front grille. The post facelift versions that appeared were known as the NH versions, or also as the B-series. NH stood for "Nouvel Habillage" (literally "New Clothing").

1934 was also the year that saw the introduction of the Rosalie's mould-shattering successor, the front-wheel-drive semi-monocoque Citroën Traction Avant. The Traction endured a troubled and prolonged birth process, however, and was part of an ambitious investment programme which involved, also in 1934, the bankruptcy of the business, and its acquisition by Citroën's principal creditor. The patron himself died in 1935. In this troubled situation, availability of the larger Rosalies (although re-engined with a turned-around version of the new Traction's OHV four-cylinder engines) continued until 1938: it is only through the distorting prism of subsequent events that its reputation has been diminished when set against the technical brilliance of its successor.

All in all, 88,090 four-cylinder and 7,230 six-cylinder Rosalies were built (38,840 small 7/8's, and 49,250 bigger 10/11's). Of the total produced 8,400 were of the short-lived, facelifted B-series (NH) and around 15,000 were of the latter "MI" cars.

== The 8CV ==
The smallest Rosalie, like the Citroën Type B of the first half of the 1920s, featured a four-cylinder motor of 1,452 cc, driving the rear wheels. The three-speed gear box featured synchromesh on the two higher ranges, and braking was provided by drum brakes on all four wheels. The car was 4.27 metres (168.1 in) long and offered a maximum speed of 90 km/h (56 mph).

== The 10CV ==
The 10CV offered a four-cylinder motor of 1,767 cc and a claimed maximum speed of 100 km/h (62 mph). At 4.57 metres (179.9 in) long it was larger than its four-cylinder sibling. In most other respects it was mechanically identical to the 8CV. Commercially, however, it enjoyed greater success, possibly because of a wider range of available versions which included the lighter (and implicitly therefore faster) Rosalie 10 Légère.

== The 15CV ==
The larger Rosalie featured a six-cylinder engine of 2,650 cc, the cylinders themselves being the same size as those of the 10CV. The length of the engine block required a lengthened bonnet/hood: the total length of the vehicle was 4.72 metres (185.8 in). Various body types and configurations were available, including a 15 Légère - effectively a 15CV with the shorter passenger cabin length of the 10CV - which was capable of a claimed 120 km/h (75 mph) top speed. For berlines, the claimed maximum speed was 115 km/h (71 mph).

== The 7/11 ==
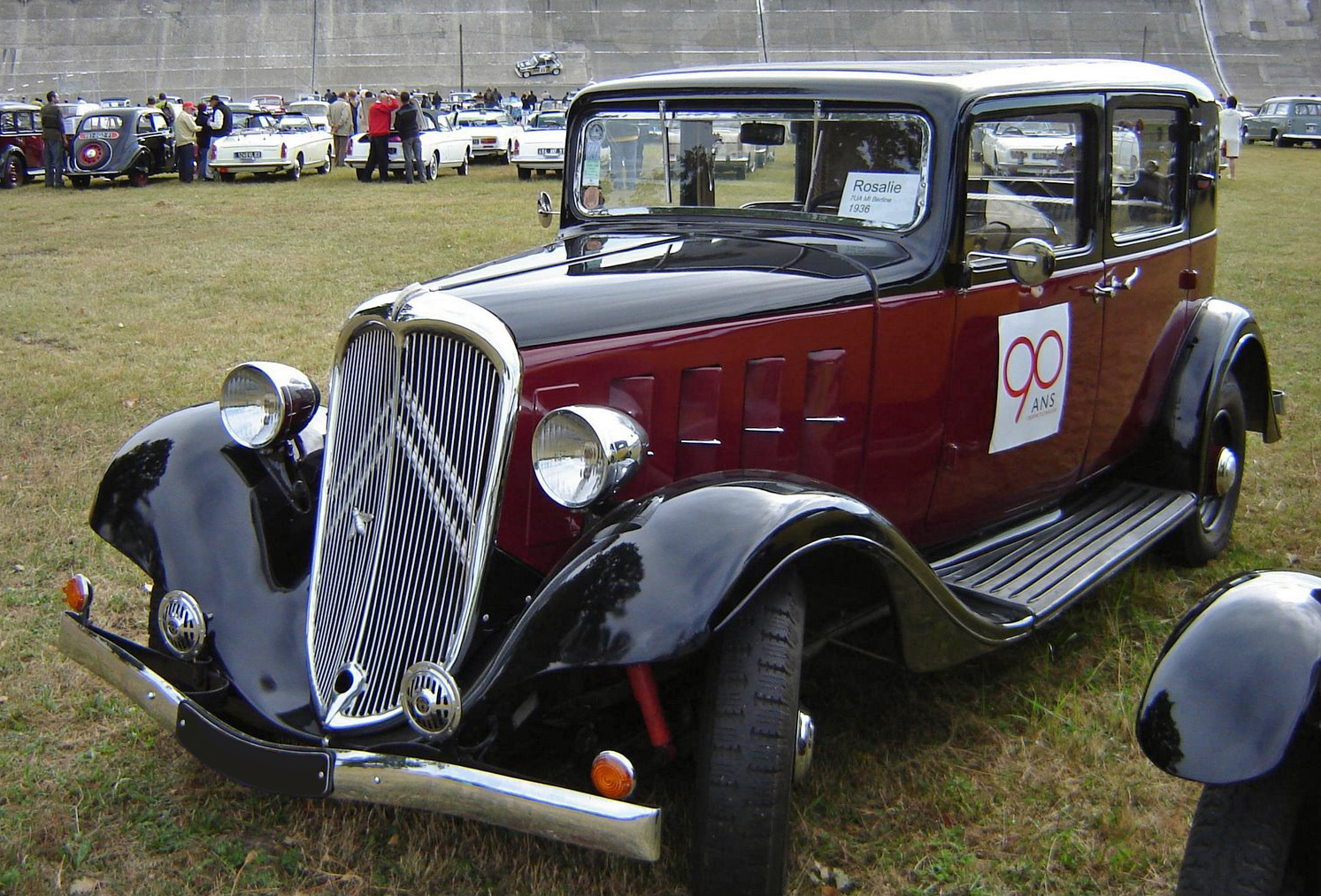
1936 Citroën Rosalie 7UA MI

For the last four model years, the 8 and 10 were replaced by the 7UA and 11UA, both called "MI" for Moteur Inversé ("reversed engine") as the engines, shared with Citroën's recently launched and much more strongly promoted front-wheel drive Traction models, were turned through 180 degrees to fit the rear-wheel drive Rosalies. While "7" usually referred to tax horsepower in the French market, the Traction 7C's 1,628 cc engine was actually a 9 CV unit - it had had to be made larger and more powerful to reach the design parameter of a 100 km/h (62 mph) top speed.

== Classification in the French tax and insurance system ==
In addition to the three official models/engines of 8 CV, 10 CV and 15 CV, listed above, the 7 CV and 11 CV engines of the new Traction Avant were also installed in the final phase. The models were then called 7 Mi and 11 Mi.
