= Citroën Traction Avant =

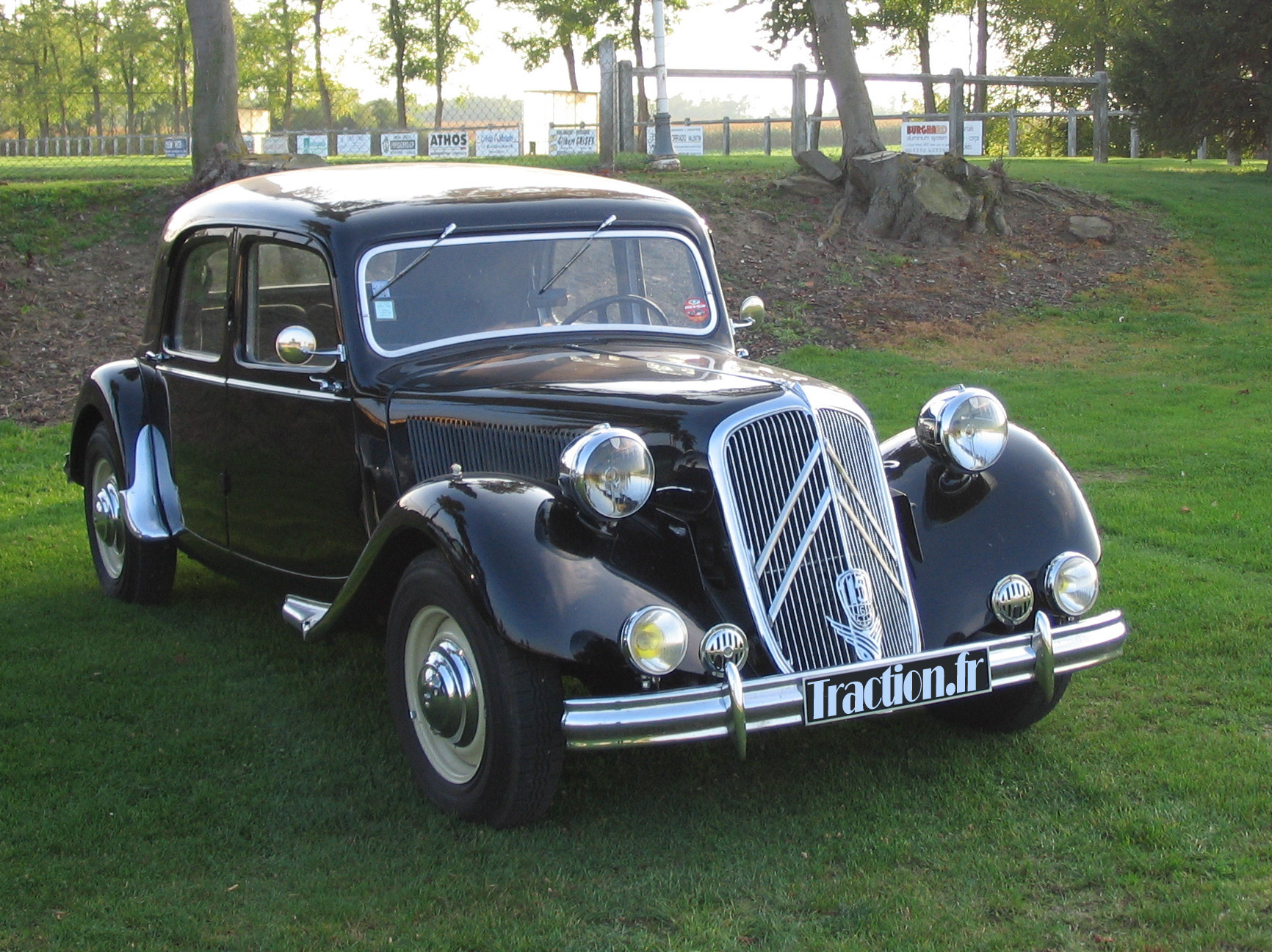

Overview
- Manufacturer: Citroën
- Also called: Citroën 7; Citroën 11; Citroën 15/6; Citroën Light Twelve (UK); Citroën Light 15 (UK); Citroën Big Fifteen (UK); Citroën Big Six (UK)
- Production: 7: 1934–1941; 11: 1934–1957; 15/6: 1938–1956
- Assembly: France: Paris; Belgium: Forest; Denmark: Copenhagen; Germany: Cologne; United Kingdom: Slough
- Designer: Flaminio Bertoni; André Lefèbvre

Body and chassis
- Class: Executive car (E)
- Body style: 4-door saloon 2-door saloon 2-door convertible 5-door hatchback
- Layout: FMF layout
- Related: Citroën H Van

Powertrain
- Engine: 1.3 / 1.5 / 1.6 / 1.9 L I4; 2.9 L I6
- Transmission: 3-speed manual, column/dash shift

Dimensions
- Wheelbase: 7 & 11 légère: 2,910 mm (114.6 in); 11CV normale & 15/6: 3,090 mm (121.7 in); 11CV longue & 15/6 limousine: 3,270 mm (128.7 in)
- Length: 4,450–4,960 mm (175.2–195.3 in)
- Width: 1,620–1,790 mm (63.8–70.5 in)
- Height: 1,520–1,580 mm (59.8–62.2 in)
- Kerb weight: 1,025–1,170 kg (2,260–2,579 lb)

Chronology
- Predecessor: Citroën Rosalie; Citroën C4 & C6
- Successor: Citroën DS

The Citroën Traction Avant (French pronunciation: [tʁaksjɔnaˈvɑ̃]) is the world's first mass-produced, semi-monocoque bodied, front-wheel drive car. A range of mostly four-door saloons and executive cars, as well as longer wheelbased "Commerciale", and three row seating "Familiale" models, were produced with four- and six-cylinder engines, by French carmaker Citroën from 1934 to 1957. With some 760,000 units built, the Traction Avants were the first front-wheel drives made in such (six-figure) quantity.

Whilst front-wheel drive and four-wheel independent suspension had been established in production cars by Auto Union, and subsequently by others a few years prior – the Traction Avant pioneered integrating these into a mass-production car with a crash resistant, largely unitary, monocoque body. Additionally, the car was also an early adopter of rack and pinion steering.

Although the car's name ("Traction Avant" literally means "front traction") emphasized its front-wheel drive power delivery, the car stood out at least as much by its much lower profile and stance – made possible by the absence of a separate vehicle frame or chassis under the car's mostly unitary body – sharply distinguishing it visually from its taller contemporaries.

== History ==
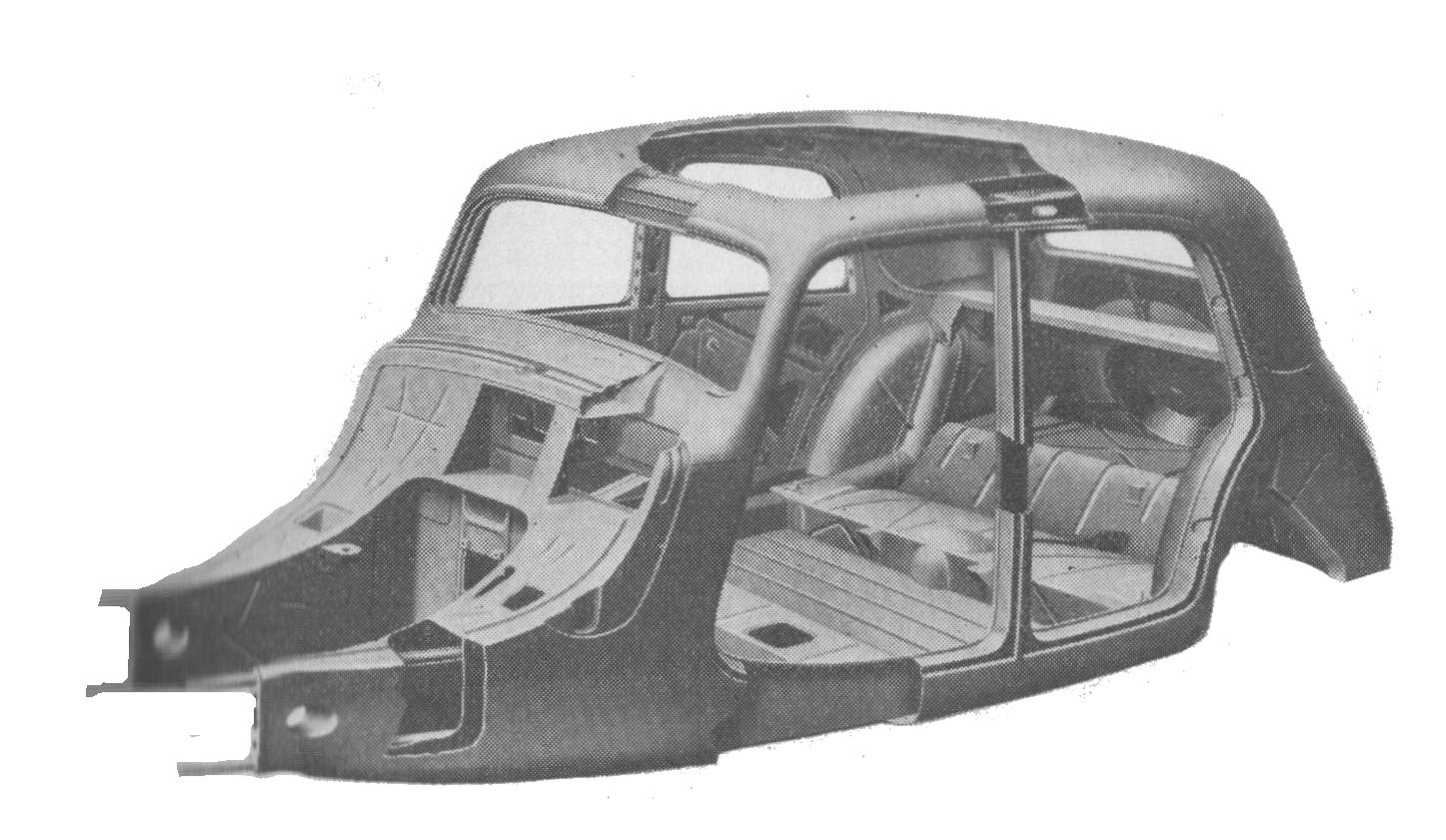
The unitized construction of the Traction Avant body

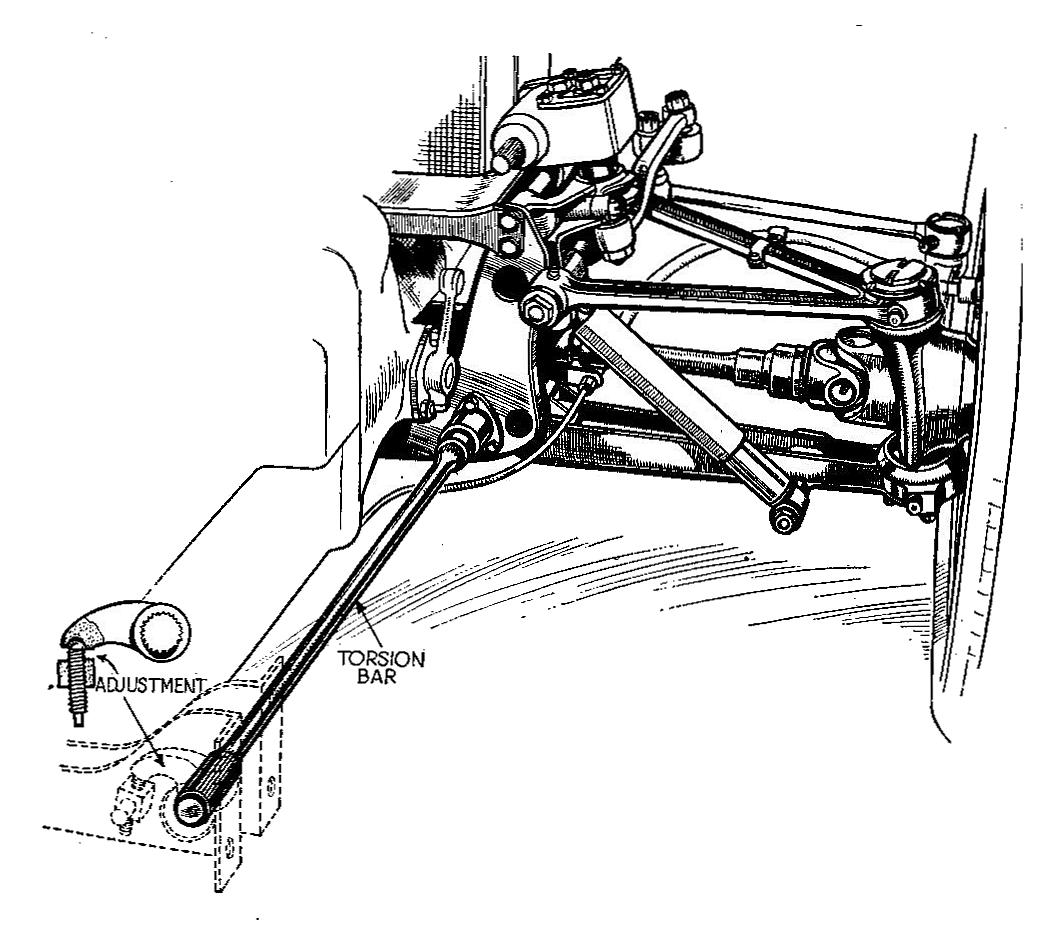
Front torsion bar suspension, which mated to the body through a subframe

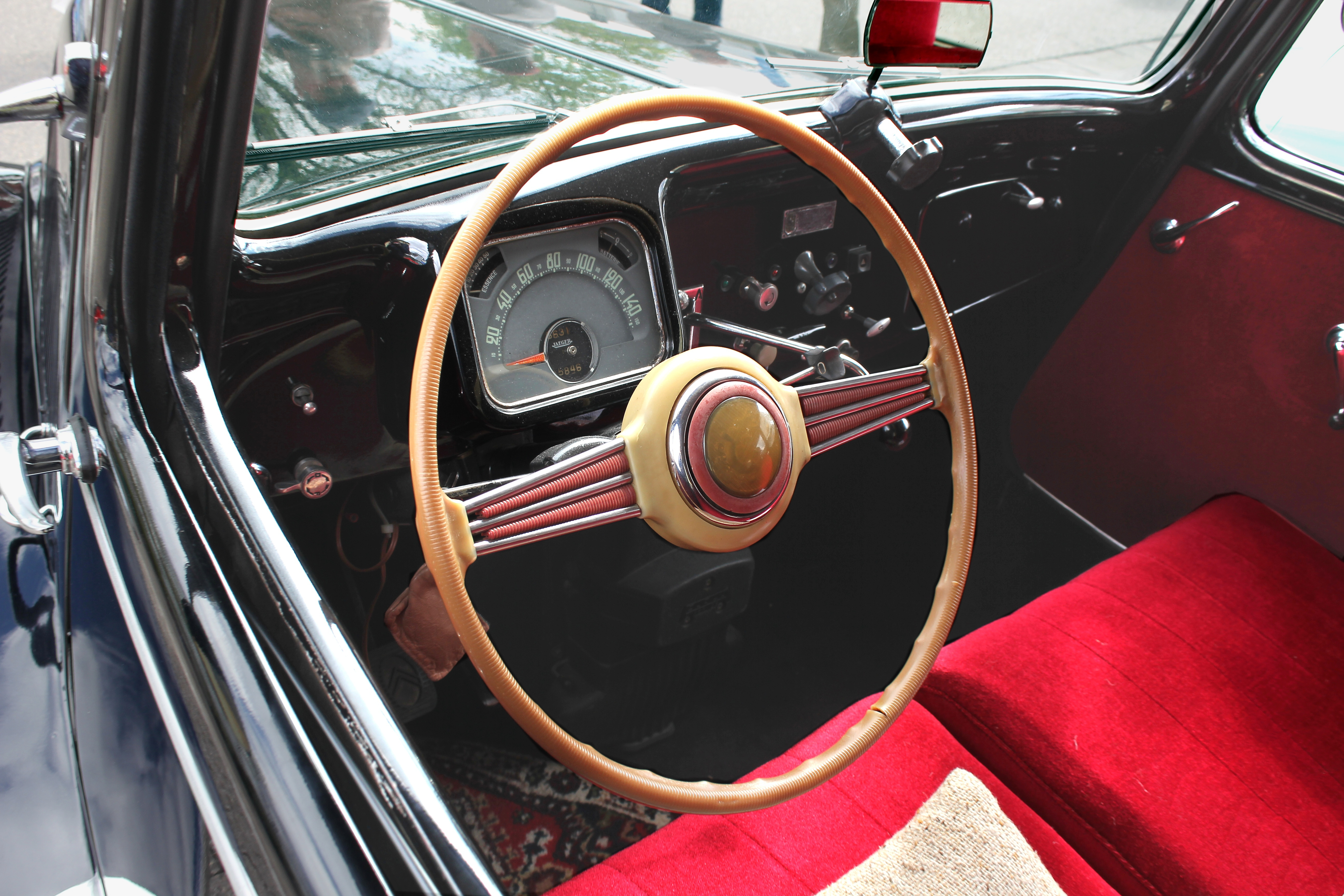
Dashboard of TA Commerciale from 1954

The Traction Avant, French for front-wheel drive, was designed by André Lefèbvre and Flaminio Bertoni in late 1933 / early 1934.

The Traction Avant was a recent entrant into the growing European front-wheel drive market, competing with the well established DKW F2 and Adler Trumpf models and joining other entrants at around the same time such as the BSA Scout. Front-wheel drive had appeared in the previous decade through luxury vehicle manufacturers Alvis, which built the 1928 Racing FWD in the UK, and Cord, which produced the L29 from 1929 to 1932 in the United States. Ultimately, the inline engine, front wheel drive layout of cars like the Citroën Avant was to be a dead end. Virtually all modern mass-produced front wheel drive cars use the compact transverse engine layout, as pioneered by DKW F1 from 1931 with a small two cylinder two stroke engine.

The Traction Avant's structure was a welded unitary body / chassis. Most other cars of the era were based on a separate frame (chassis) onto which the non-structural body ("coachwork") was built. Unitary construction (also called Unit Body or "Unibody" in the US) results in a lighter vehicle. It is now used for virtually all car construction.

This unitary body saved 70 kg (150 lb) in steel per car. It was mass-produced, using innovative technology purchased from the American firm Budd Company. Weight reduction was a motivation for Citroën that American manufacturers of that time did not have.

This method of construction was viewed with great suspicion in many quarters, with doubts about its strength. A type of crash test was conceived, taking the form of driving the car off a cliff, to illustrate its great inherent resilience.

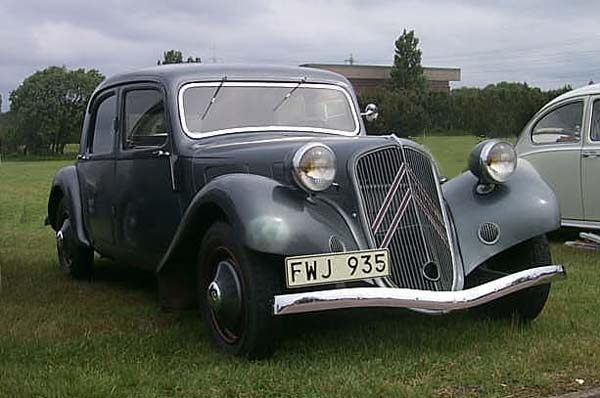
A low-slung Big Fifteen sedan

The novel design made the car very low-slung relative to its contemporaries – the Traction Avant went from appearing rakish in 1934 to familiar and somewhat old fashioned by 1955.

The suspension was very advanced for the car's era. The front wheels were independently sprung, using a torsion bar and wishbone suspension arrangement, where most contemporaries used live axle and cart-type leaf spring designs. The rear suspension was a simple steel beam axle and a Panhard rod, trailing arms and torsion bars attached to a 75-millimetre (3 in) steel tube, which in turn was bolted to the main platform.

Since it was considerably lighter than conventional designs of the era, it was capable of 100 km/h (62 mph), and consumed fuel only at the rate of 10 L/100 km (28 mpg_{‑imp}; 24 mpg_{‑US}).

=== Investing for volume production ===
The scale of investment in production capacity reflected André Citroën's ambitions for the car. Site preparation began during the winter of 1932/33, and on 15 March 1933 demolition of the existing 30,000 m^{2} (320,000 ft^{2}) factory started. Construction of the new factory started on 21 April, and by the end of August the building's shell had been erected, four times the size of the factory that it replaced, and using 5,000 t (4,900 long tons; 5,500 short tons) of structural iron and steel. All this was achieved while continuing to produce several hundred Rosalies every day. With characteristic showmanship, André Citroën celebrated by inviting 6,000 guests – mostly dealers and agents and others who would be involved in selling and promoting the car – to a spectacular banquet in the new and, at this stage, still empty factory, on 8 October 1933. Citroën's gesture quickly came to be seen as hubristic, as the ensuing months became a race against time to finish the development of the car and tool up for its production before his investors lost patience.

In the end, the first car was presented at Citroën's huge Paris showroom on 18 April 1934, by which time principal dealers had already had their own private unveiling on 23 March. There had been much chatter and speculation; before April 1934 the details of the car had been kept remarkably quiet outside the walls of the Quai de Javel plant. Volume production formally started on 19 April 1934. Although the revolutionary unitary bodyshell was, according to most reports, not affected by the rushed launch schedule, problems with transmission joints and the hydraulic brakes – another "first" in a volume car in Europe – reflected the financial pressure to get the car into production as quickly as possible.

=== Names ===
Traction Avant, which translates as "front wheel drive", is not the official name. The car was named according to the French fiscal horsepower rating, or CV, used to determine annual car tax levels. However, manufacturers did not change the model name every time a change of engine size caused a change in fiscal horsepower.

For example, in 1934, Citroën introduced the 7, unofficially the 7A. They continued calling the car 7 when the 7B model's larger engine pushed it into the 9 CV tax band. Other designations were 11, 15/6 into the 16 CV tax band and 22.

In France, the Traction is known as "Reine de la Route" ("Queen of the Road").

=== Wartime disruption ===
In September 1939, France declared war on Germany, and in June 1940 the German Army rapidly invaded and occupied Northern France. The war years were characterised by a desperate shortage of raw materials for civilian industry and of petrol, but these factors were not apparent instantly. The Paris Motor Show scheduled for October 1939 was cancelled at short notice; Citroën's own planned announcements had involved the forthcoming 2CV model rather than any significant changes to the Traction. For the Traction Avant, the last "normal" year in terms of production levels was 1939, and 8,120 of the 7C model, with 2,910 mm (115 in) wheelbase and 1,628 cc (99.3 cu in), were produced. This fell to 1,133 in 1940, which was the first year when the plant suffered serious bomb damage – on this occasion caused by a German air attack – on 3 June 1940. Production of the cars was suspended in June 1941; by then a further 154 had been produced in the previous six-month period. The 7C continued to appear in Citroën price-lists until March 1944, but production of this smaller engined 7CV was not resumed after the war. For the more powerful 1911 cc engined 11 B-light models, the equivalent figures were 27,473 units produced in 1939, 4,415 in 1940 and 2,032 for 1941, though for this model production in 1941 ended only in November 1941 so the figure for that year represents 11 months of production.

In 1945, production restarted only slowly: the 11 B-light reappeared very little changed from the 1941 cars except that headlight surrounds were now painted rather than finished in chrome. By the end of December 1945, the year's production had reached 1,525. Currency depreciation is evident from the car's listed price, which had been 26,800 francs in January 1940, and had risen to 110,670 francs in October 1945. In 1945, the car was the only model available from Citroën, and as another sign of the times, customers not able to supply their own tires were charged an additional 9,455 francs for a set of five. In May 1946, presumably reflecting an easing of the war-time tire shortage, the car could at last be purchased with tires at no extra cost, but by now the overall price of an 11 B-light had risen to 121,180 francs.

The 11 B-normal model, differentiated from the 11 B-light by its 3,090 mm (122 in) wheelbase, underwent a similar drop in sales volumes between 1939 and 1941, with just 341 cars produced during the first seven months of 1941. After the war, a single 11 B-normal was produced in 1946, in time to be presented at the October 1946 Paris Motor Show: production built up during 1947, but during the car's ten-year post-war production period, the shorter 11 B-light would, in France, continue to outsell the 11 B-normal.

Initially the French Army lacked enthusiasm for the Traction Avant, believing it offered insufficient ground clearance for their needs. Nevertheless, by September 1939, roughly 250 had found their way into military service. With losses of cars at the frontier mounting, Citroën supplied a further 570 to the Army between February and May 1940, and subsequent deliveries probably took place before military defeat intervened. During the war many of the cars were reregistered with "WH..." (Wehrmacht Heer/Army command) license plates, having been requisitioned by the German Army. These gave reliable service both in France and further afield, notably in Libya and Stalingrad. Traction Avants were also favoured by the Resistance, and as occupation gave way to Liberation they turned up all over France with FFI inscribed proudly on their doors. Less gloriously, the cars were known as favourites among gangsters such as Pierrot le Fou and his Traction gang.

== Engineering ==
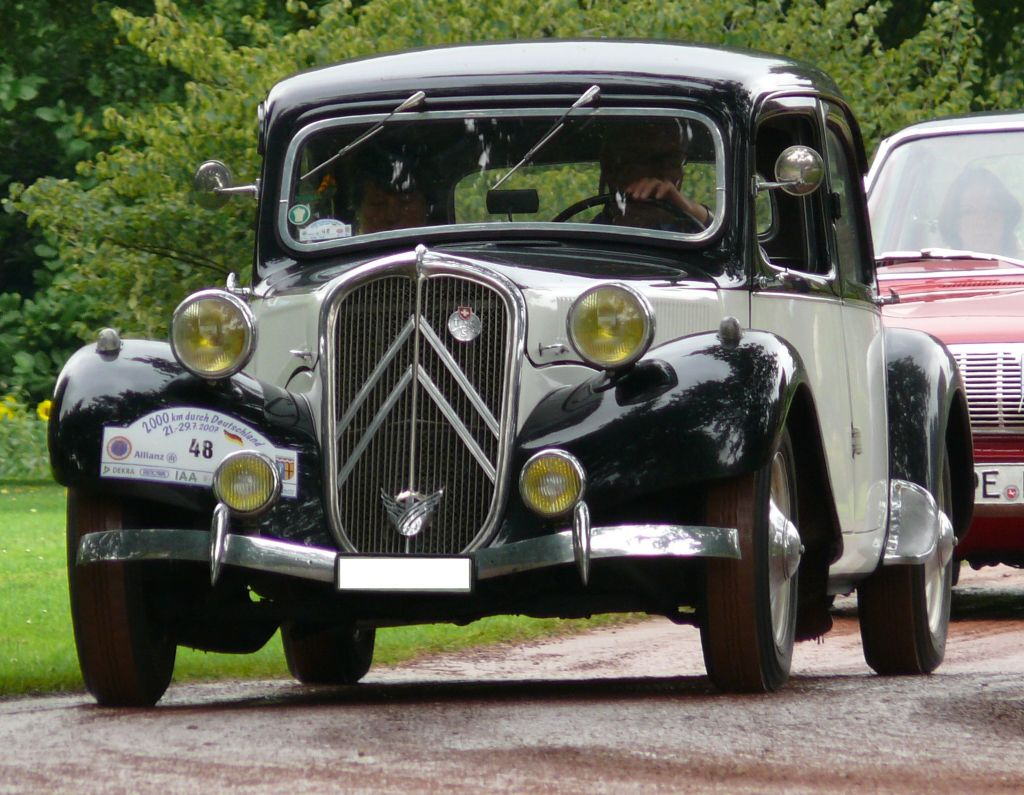
Citroën 11 CV Légère

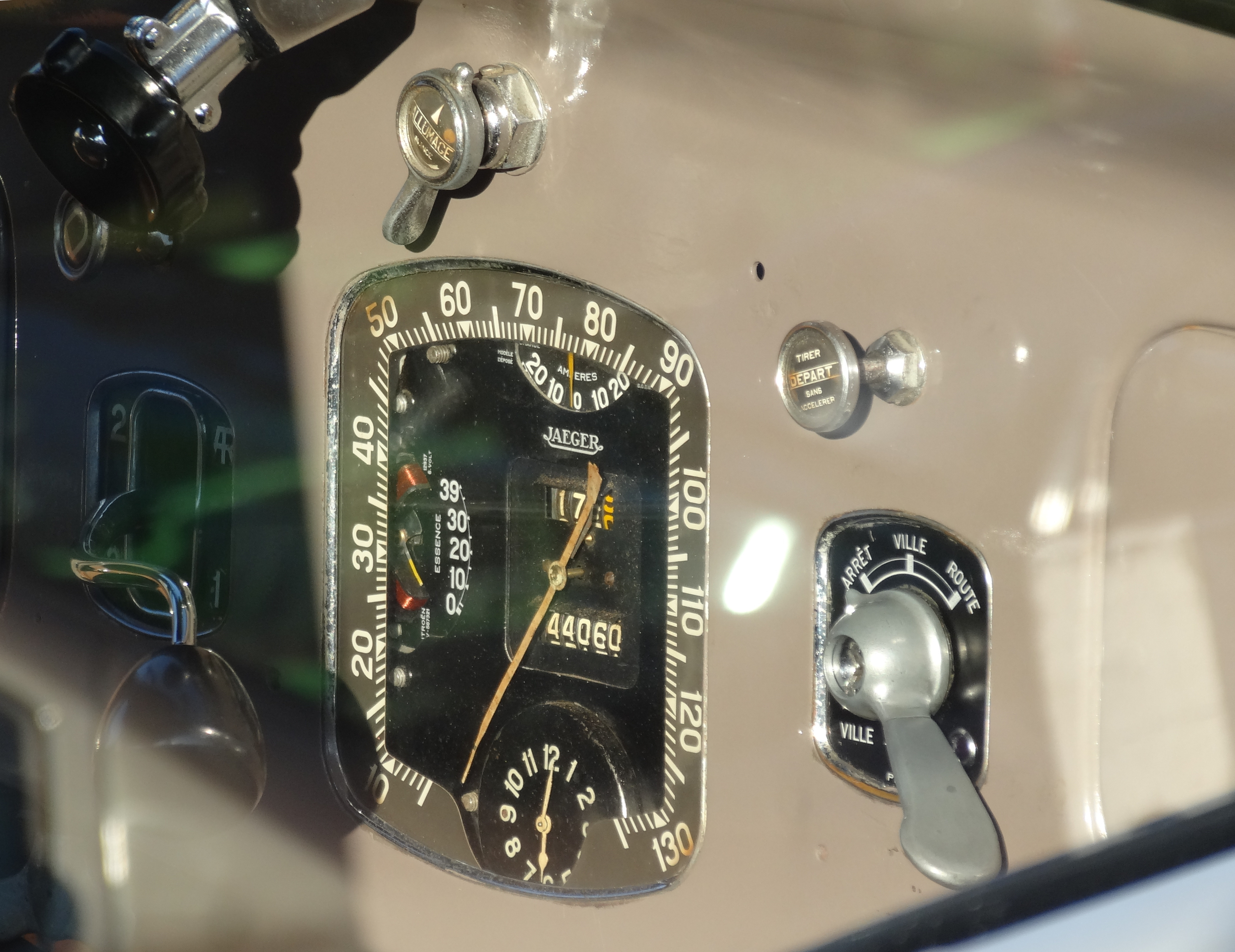
Dashboard view: gear change handle visible on the left

Contrary to a fully unitized body design, the Traction Avant uses a significant front subframe to carry its front-mounted gearbox and front mid-mounted engine, and to connect its front-wheel drivetrain and independent suspension to the monocoque passenger cabin behind it.

The Traction Avant used a longitudinal, front-wheel drive layout, with the engine set well within the wheelbase, resulting in a very favourable weight distribution, aiding the car's advanced handling characteristics. The gearbox was placed at the front of the vehicle with the engine behind it and the differential between them, a layout shared with the later Renault 4 and 16 and first generation Renault 5, but the opposite way round to many longitudinal front-wheel drive cars, such as the Saab 96, Renault 12 and 18 and most Audi models.

The gear change was set in the dashboard, with the lever protruding through a vertical, H-shaped gate. Because this vertical orientation could have resulted in the car dropping out of gear when the lever was in the upper positions (i.e. second or reverse gears), the gear-shift mechanism was locked when the mechanical clutch was engaged and released when the clutch pedal was depressed. The result of this layout, along with pendant pedals, umbrella-type handbrake control and front bench seats, was a very spacious interior, with a flat and unobstructed floor. The low-slung arrangement also eliminated the need for running boards to step into or out of the vehicle. These features made them ideal for use as limousines and taxi cabs, and they were quite popular among drivers and passengers alike. Until 1953, black was the only colour available.

=== Classification in the French tax and insurance system ===
The two four-cylinder engines had 7 CV and 11 CV as their name suggested. The six-cylinder 15 CV-Six, on the other hand, actually had 16 CV, while the eight-cylinder, of which only twelve were built, had, as its name suggests, 22 CV.

== Variants ==
=== Standard production sedans ===
The original model was a small saloon with a 2,910 mm (115 in) wheelbase, and a 1,303 cc (79.5 cu in) engine:from a 72 × 80 mm bore and stroke, this model was called the 7A. All the models have front suicide doors with rear conventional doors. After just 2 months, with about 7,000 cars produced, the 7A was succeeded in June 1934 by the 7B which used a higher-power engine with its cylinders bored out by 6 mm to arrive at its limit of 78 mm of bore for 1,529 cc (93.3 cu in) and provided two windscreen wipers in place of the single wiper on the original production cars. The manufacturer also took the opportunity to make a start on addressing some of the other initial "under the skin" teething problems.

By September 1934, 15,620 7Bs had been produced before it, in turn, was succeeded in October 1934 by the 7C with an even higher-output 1,628 cc (99.3 cu in) from a 72 × 100 mm bore and stroke engine.

Later models were the 11CV (launched in November 1934), which had a 78 × 100 mm bore and stroke of 1,911 cc (116.6 cu in) four-cylinder engine, and the 15/6 (launched June 1938), with a 2,867 cc (175.0 cu in) six. The 11 was an 11 CV, but curiously the 15/6 was in the 16 CV tax band. The 11 was built in two versions, the 11BL (L for Légère, or "light"), which was the same size as the 7 CV, and the 11B (Normale, or "normal"), which had a longer wheelbase and wider track.

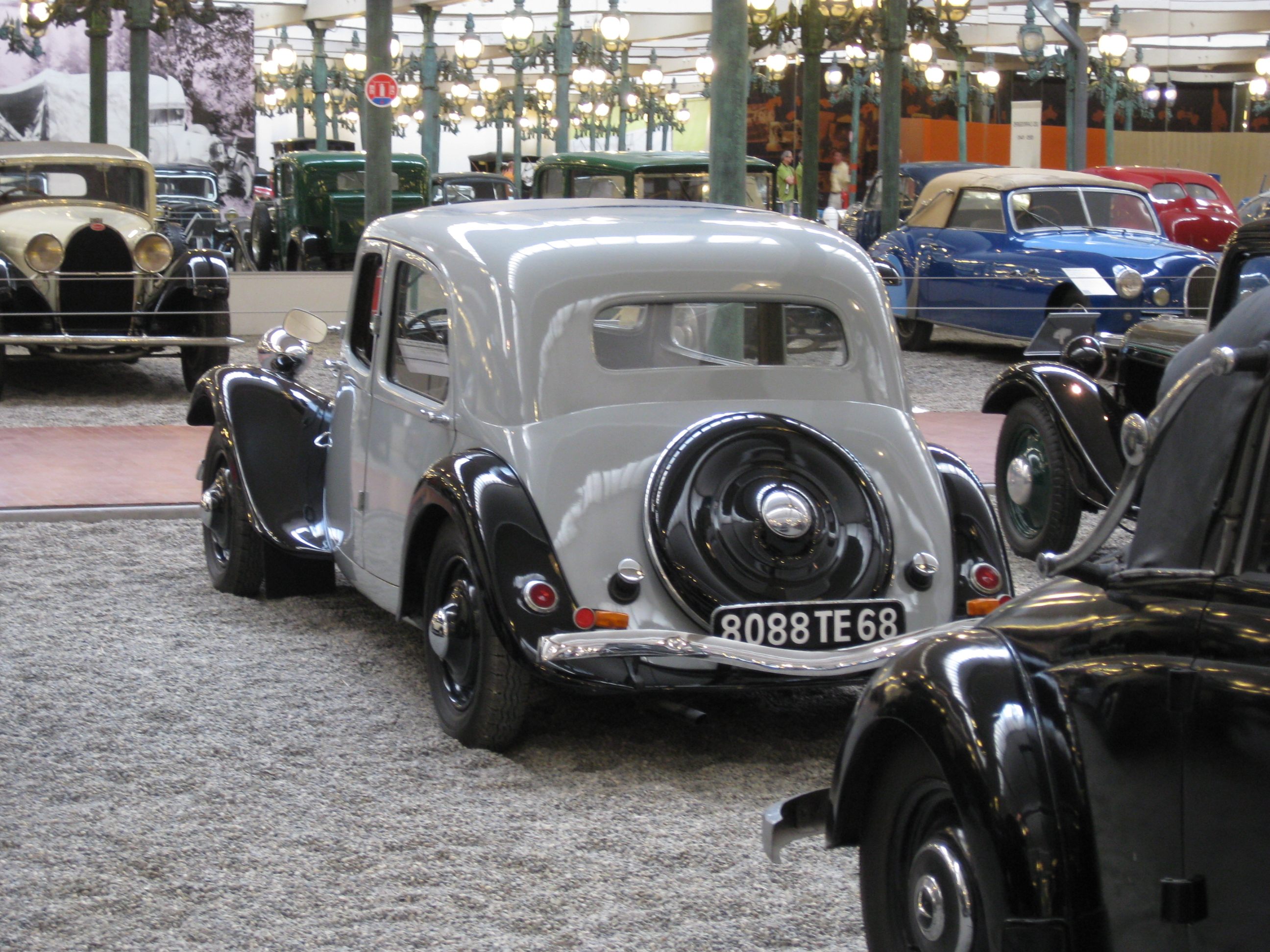
1934 Traction 7A: Before 1935, two fuel filler caps at the back; luggage access only from within

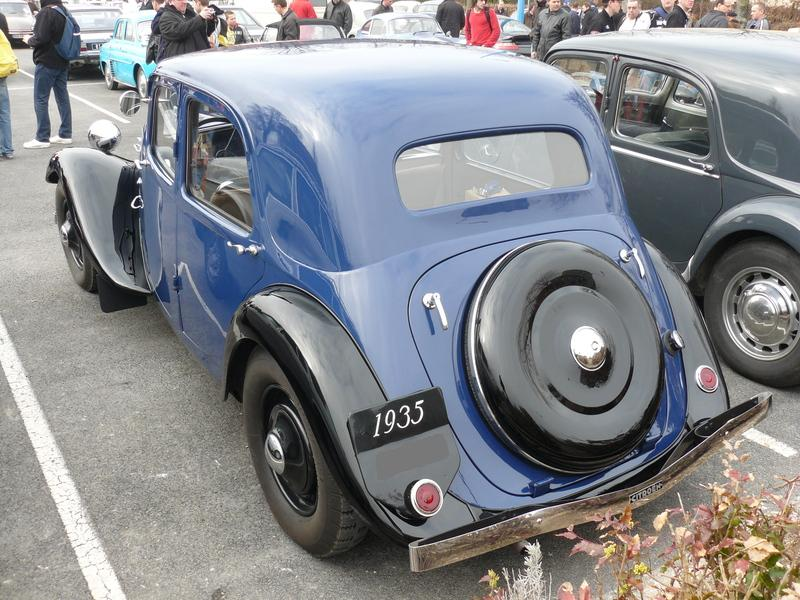
After 1935, one fuel filler cap at the back; luggage accessed from outside

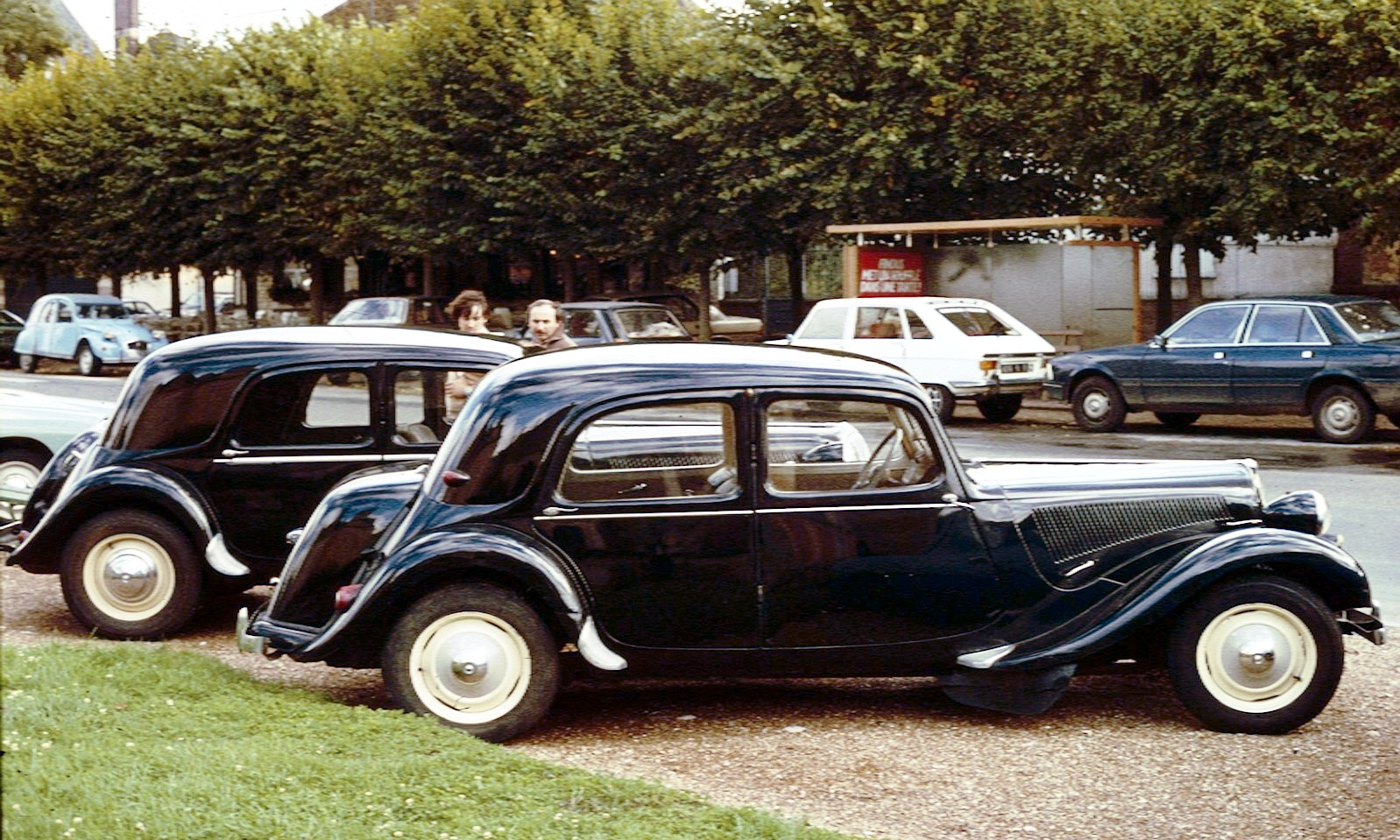
The boot was lengthened and its volume doubled in Autumn 1952

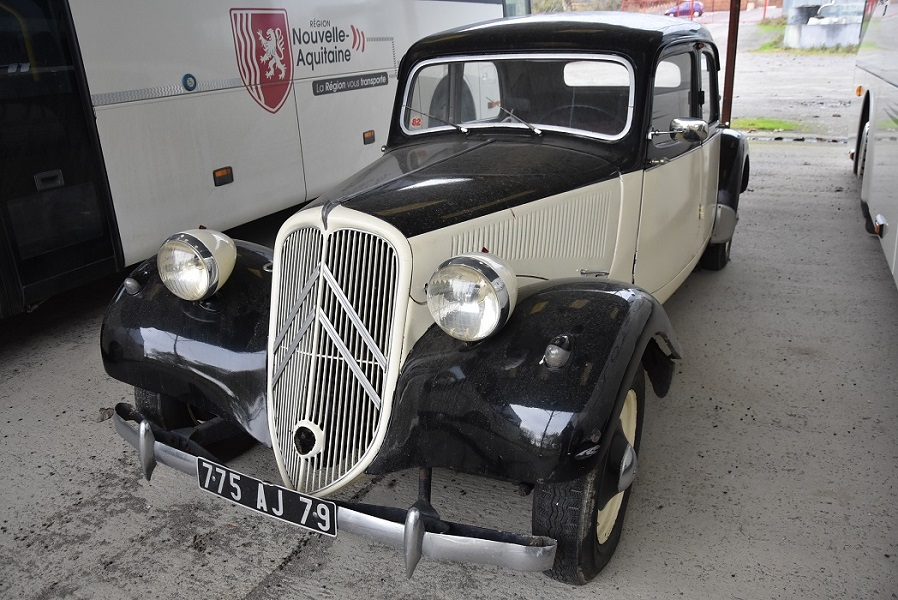
Two-tone model from 1952

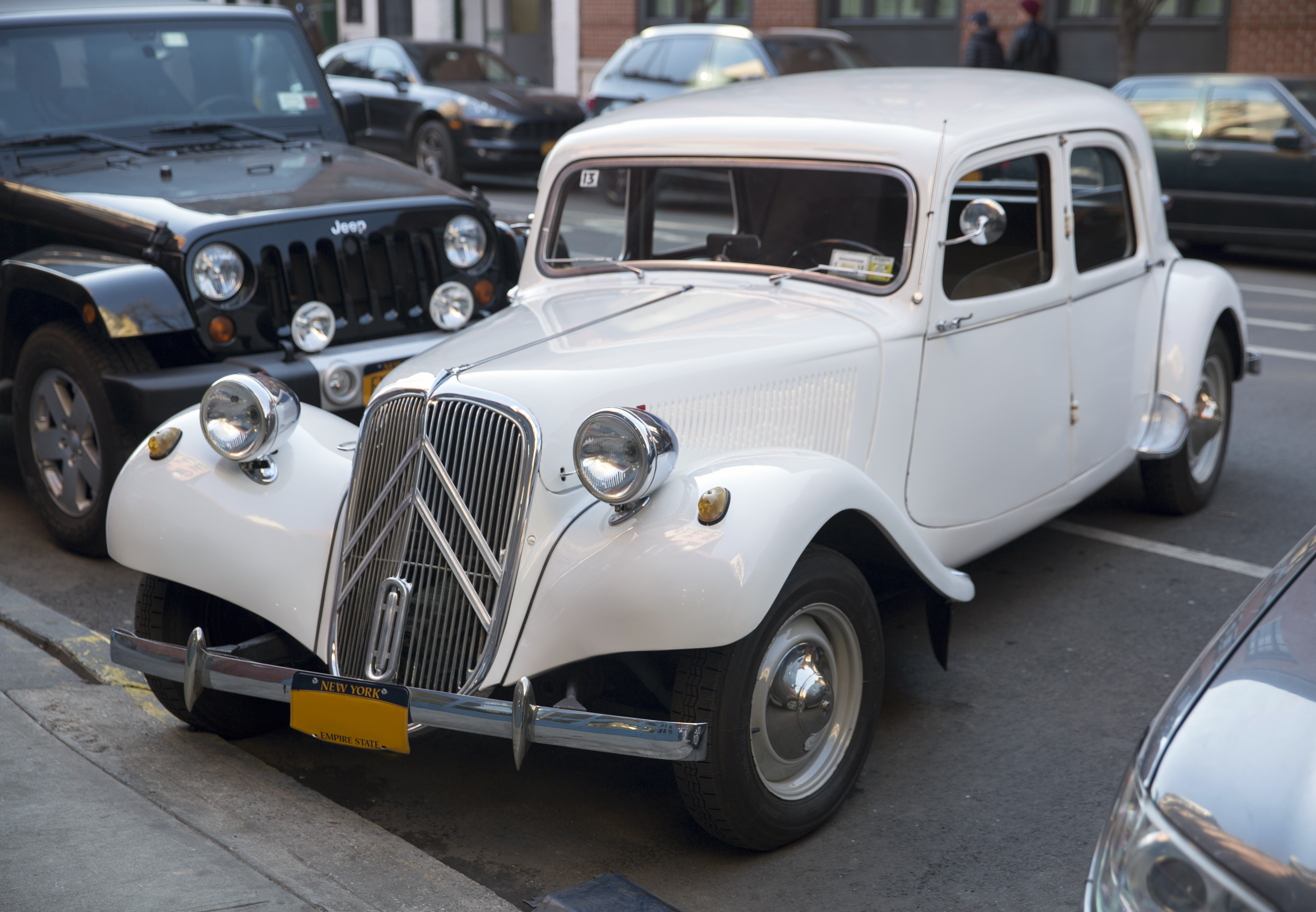
1955 Citroën Traction 11B (Normale)

For 1936, at the 29th Paris Motor Show in October 1935, various modifications were on show. At the front, painted front grilles replaced chrome ones and the headlight covers were restyled. The changes at the back were more practical and involved an opening luggage hatch/lid: it was no longer necessary to clamber over the back seats to get at the luggage space at the rear of the passenger cabin (although the overall size of the luggage locker remained at this stage rather restricted). The opening boot/trunk lid made it necessary to reposition the rear number plate, previously under most circumstances centrally mounted just above the bumper, and now mounted on the rear-wing on the left side. On the original cars, it had been possible to access the fuel tank using capped filler openings on either side, but now the left fuel filler cap was removed, and filling the fuel tank had to be done using the filler on the right side. Two months later, the radical "Pausodyne" suspension was modified, now incorporating conical rubber rings at the front.

In May 1936, recently developed new technology was added - rack and pinion steering replaced the relatively imprecise "worm and roller" steering system.

Despite Citroën's attention to the perceived shortcomings of the earlier Tractions, significant numbers of customers still opted for the manufacturer's old rear-wheel drive models which, in 1936, still accounted for more than 10 per cent of the factory's output.

To expand the customer base, the car was made as an extended length Familiale (family) model with three rows of seats, seating 9 adults. The middle row could be folded away when not in use, making for cavernous rear legroom when configured with two rows. This layout was carried forward to 1991 with the Citroën DS Familiale and the Citroën CX Familiale.

The first hatchback automobile was called the 11 CV Commerciale (commercial), and was built on this same elongated chassis. On this model, the tailgate was in two halves, the lower of which folded down to form a platform, and carried the spare wheel. The upper opening cut into the roof level. A one-piece top-hinged tailgate was introduced when the Commerciale resumed production after World War II. This car was marketed to grocers, butchers, and other tradesmen.

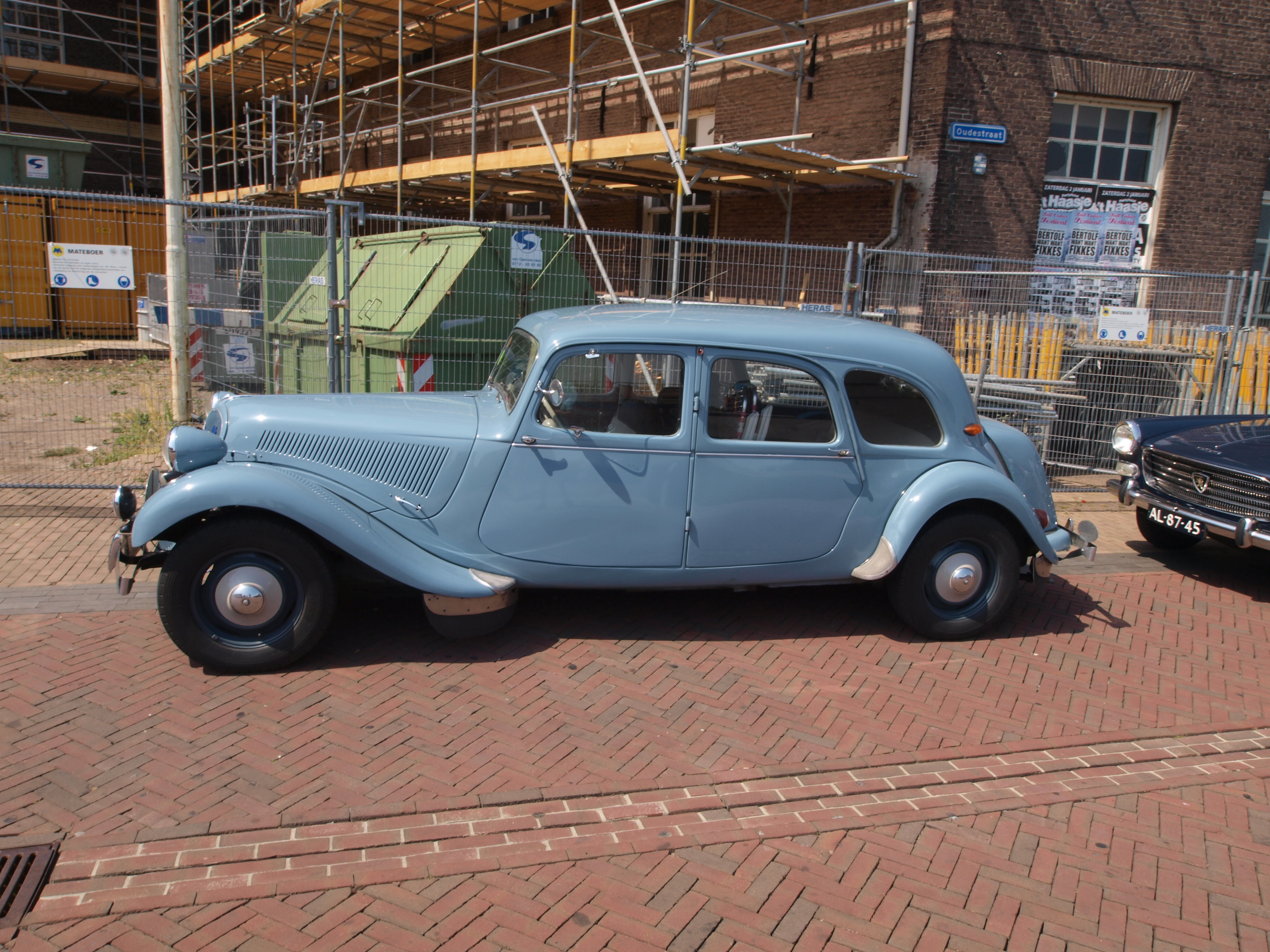
Familiale 6 windows, 9 seats

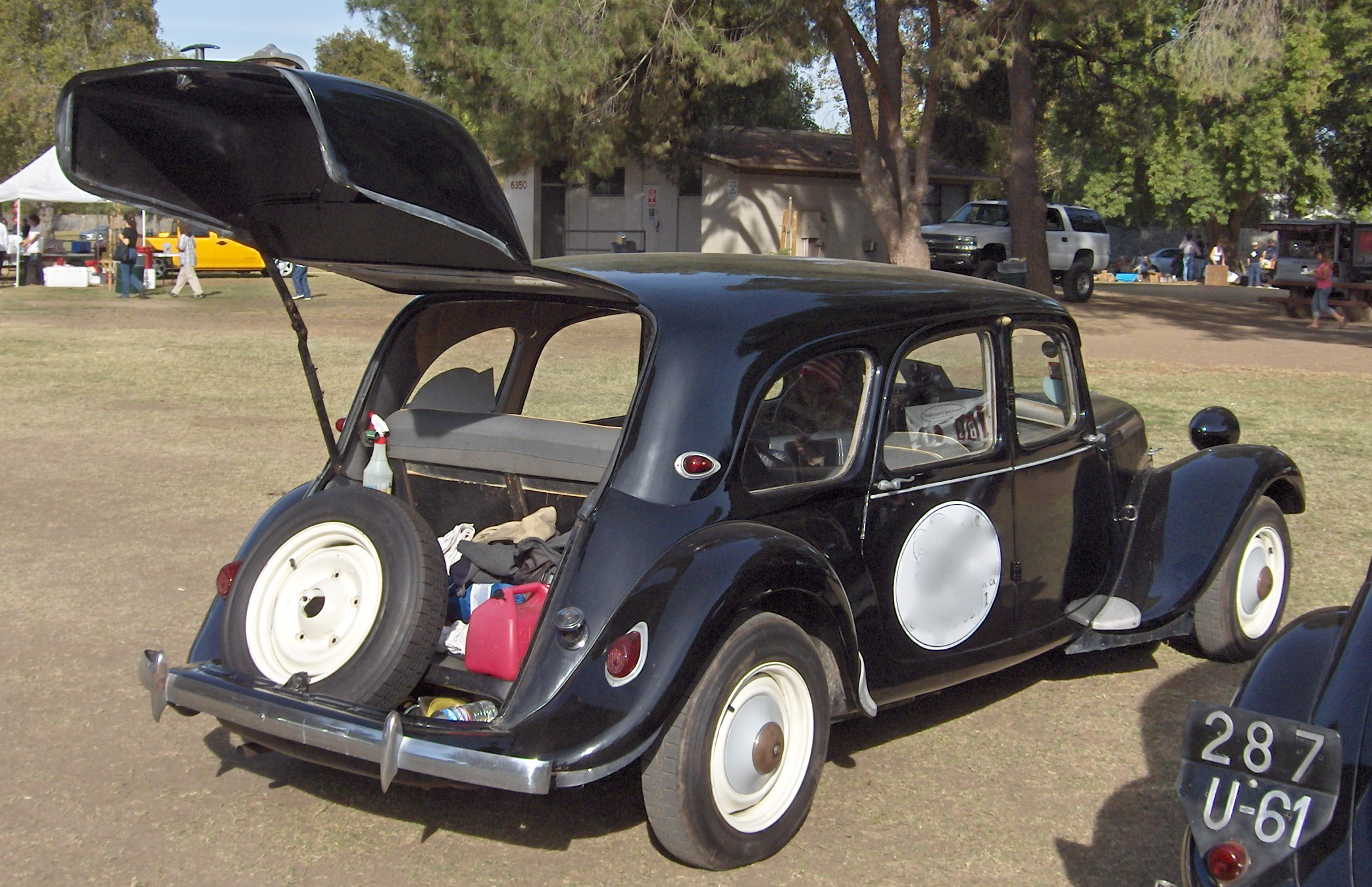
Citroën 11 Commerciale 5-door hatchback

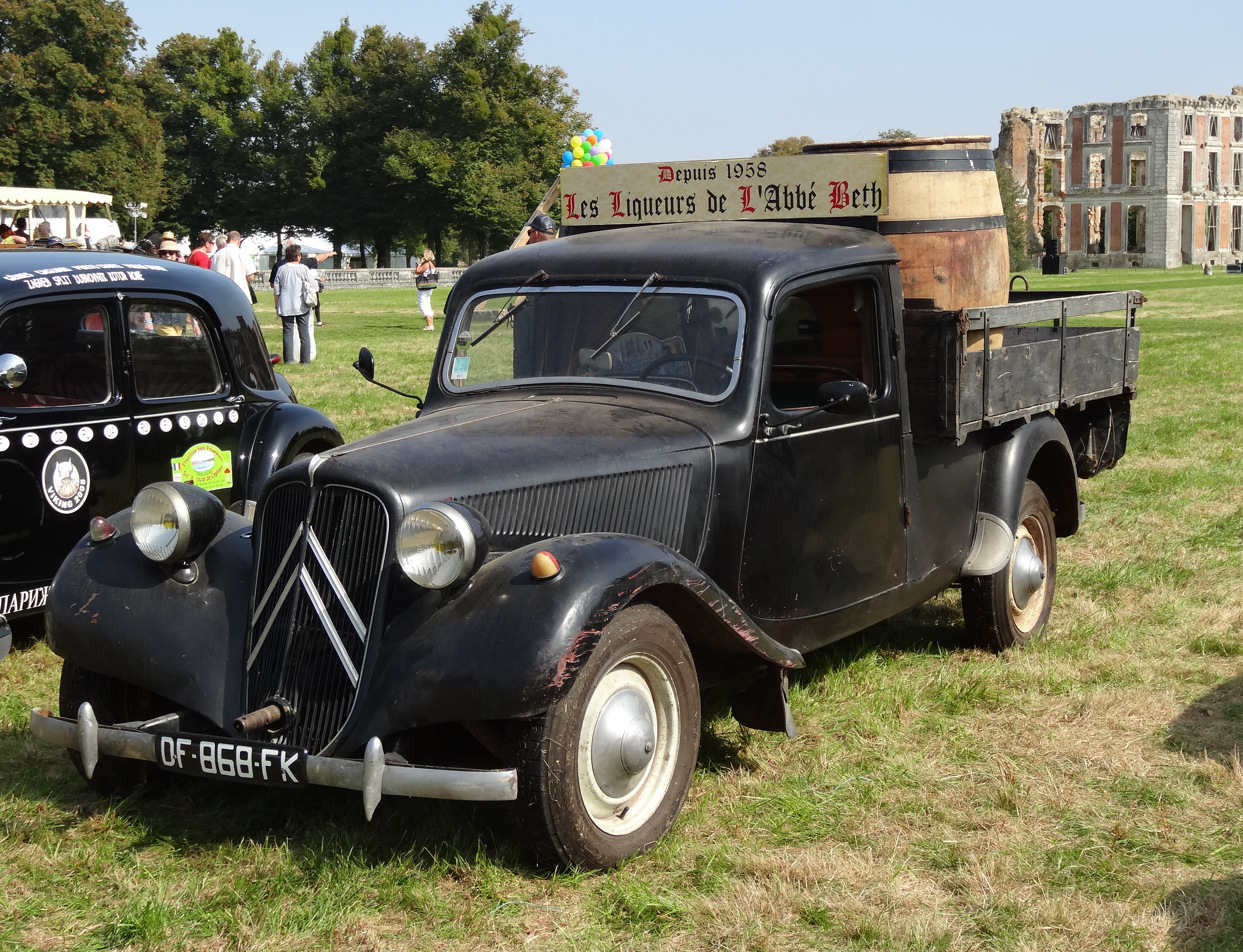
Traction Avant pick-up

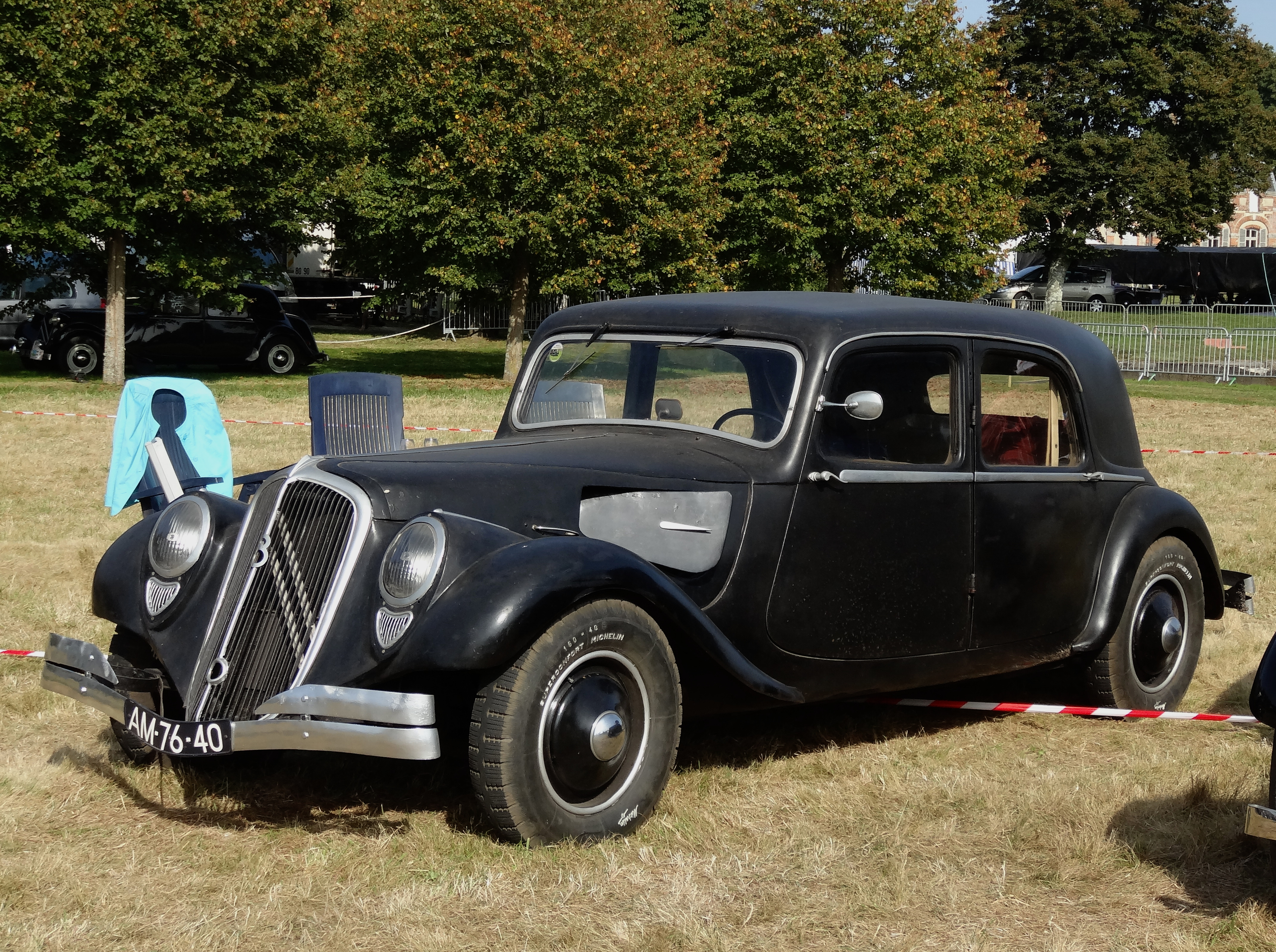
1934 22CV V8 engined recreation - model never entered production

Left-hand drive versions were built in Paris and Forest, Belgium. 550 additional cars were built in Copenhagen, Denmark for tax purposes - special 2-door commercial vans.

=== Models that did not enter production ===
Citroën planned two variants that never entered production, since there was insufficient funding to develop them, except as running prototype vehicles. One was an automatic transmission-equipped model, based on the Sensaud de Lavaud automatic transmission, the other a 22 CV model with a 3.8 litre V8 (bore: 78 mm, stroke: 100 mm, 3822.7 cc).

The transmission (which was actually originally designed for the Citroën) was a "gearless" automatic, using the torque-converter alone to match engine revolutions to the drivetrain revolutions, much like the Dynaflow Transmission introduced later in the US. The car was supposed to have a less spartan interior than the other Traction Avants and it was to feature Citroën's own new V8 engine. About twenty prototypes were made, but the project was canceled at the start of 1935 after the company's bankruptcy and resulting Michelin takeover, which rapidly led to a level of financial discipline that the company had hitherto heroically failed to apply. The prototype 22CVs were probably all destroyed. According to some sources they were fitted with the standard front and the ordinary four-cylinder engines and were sold as 11CVs. The 22CVs sometimes shown today are recreations, usually powered by Ford flathead engines.

=== Coupés/Convertibles ===
In addition to the 4-door body, before the war, the factory also produced a 2-door coupé and convertible with rumble seats.

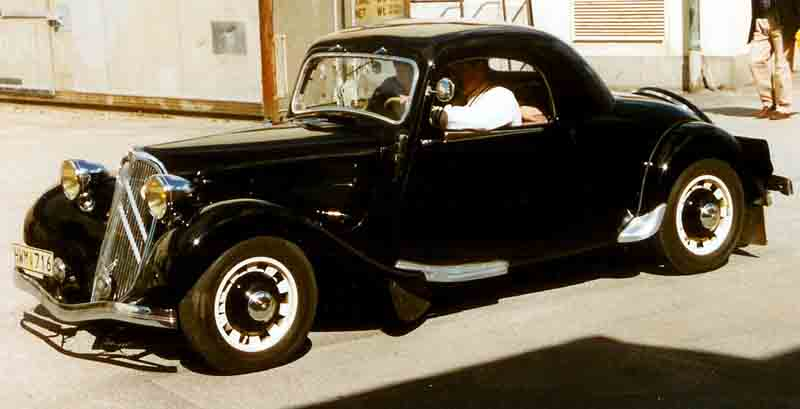
1937 Citroën 7C 2-door Sedan, also called the Faux Cabriolet

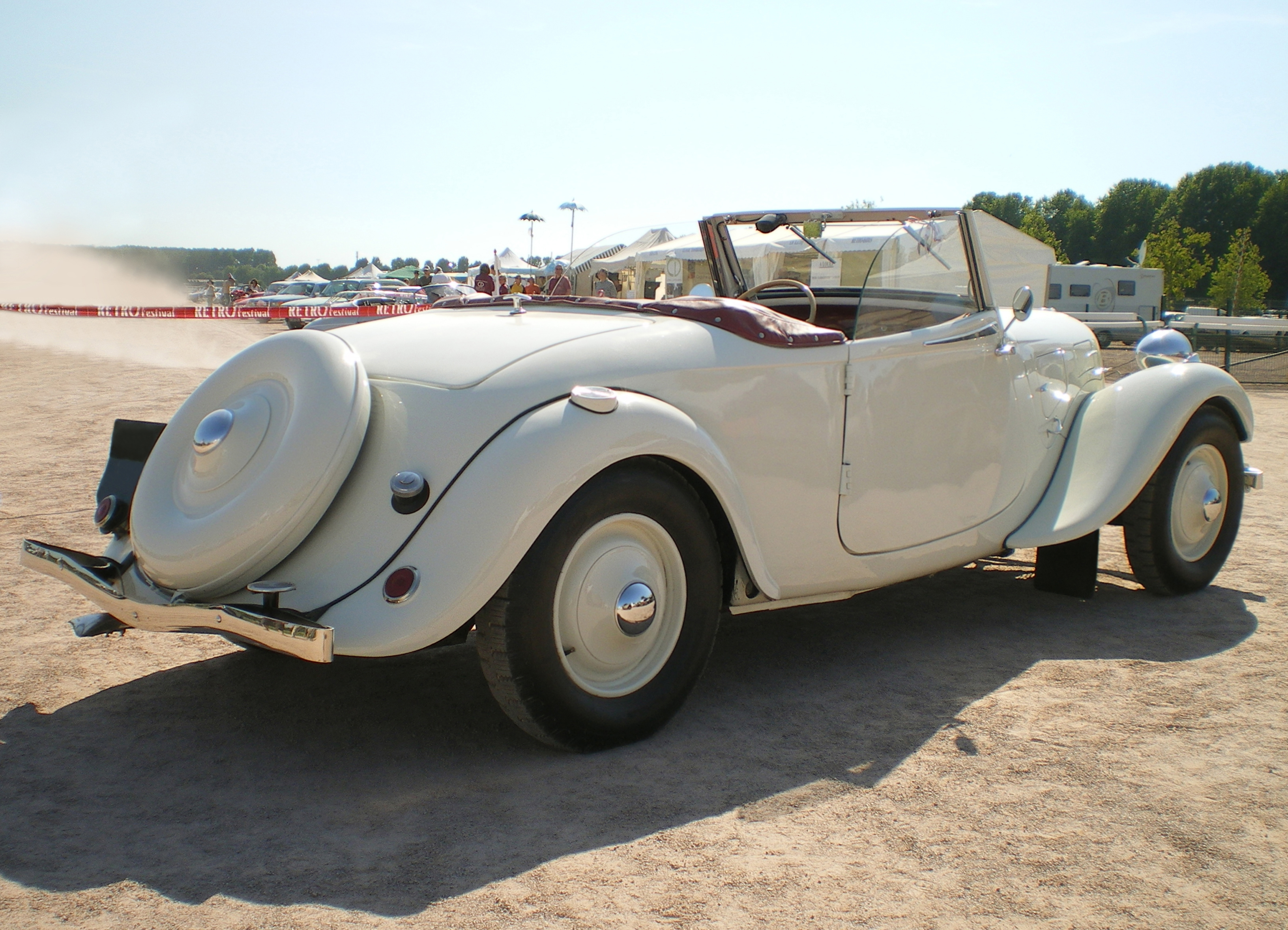
Citroën 7C Cabriolet

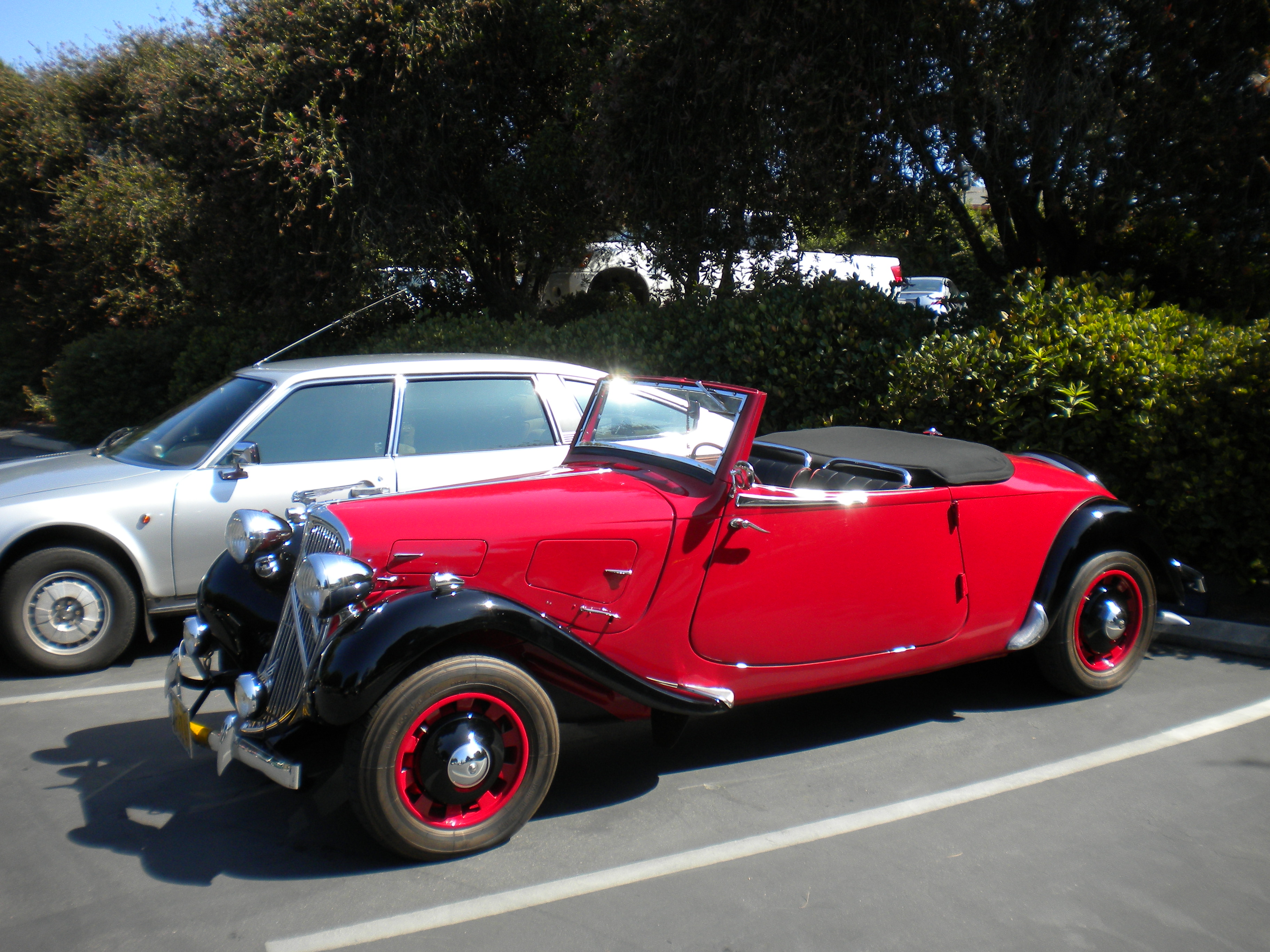
'Challenger'- rebadged Traction Avant imported by "The Challenger Motor Car Corporation" of Los Angeles in the late 1930s

=== Hydraulic self-levelling suspension in 1954 ===
The six-cylinder, 2876 cc model was used as a "Test Bed" for the introduction of the hydropneumatic suspension that underpinned the revolutionary Citroën DS19 that was launched at the Paris Motor Show in 1955. The suspension was fitted to the rear suspension of the 15/6 H with a lever in the boot to permit the ride height to be modified. A dashboard-mounted override control was fitted to allow the rear suspension to be locked in normal ride height when parked, so the car did not drop in response to loading and unloading. It automatically released when the clutch was operated when driving off. A belt driven high-pressure pump was added and an under-bonnet reservoir to hold the "LHS" hydraulic fluid. Many of the hydraulic parts were interchangeable with the early DS 19 models (which also had hydraulic disk brakes, hydraulically assisted steering and a hydraulically operated "semi-automatic" gearbox).

These other hydraulic features were not fitted to the 15/6 H, which ceased production in 1956, one year after the arrival of the DS.

=== UK-built cars ===
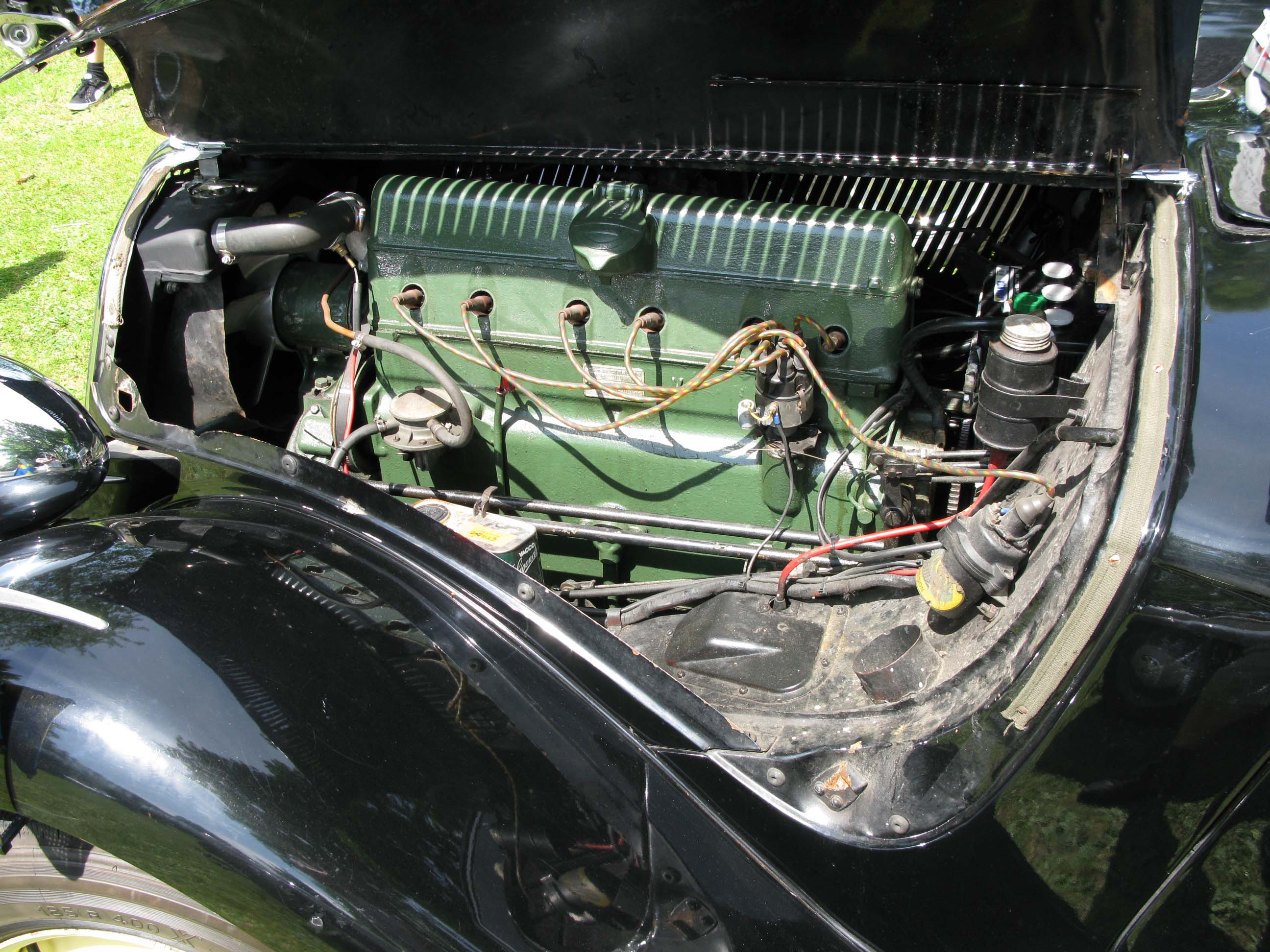
15/6 6 cylinder engine

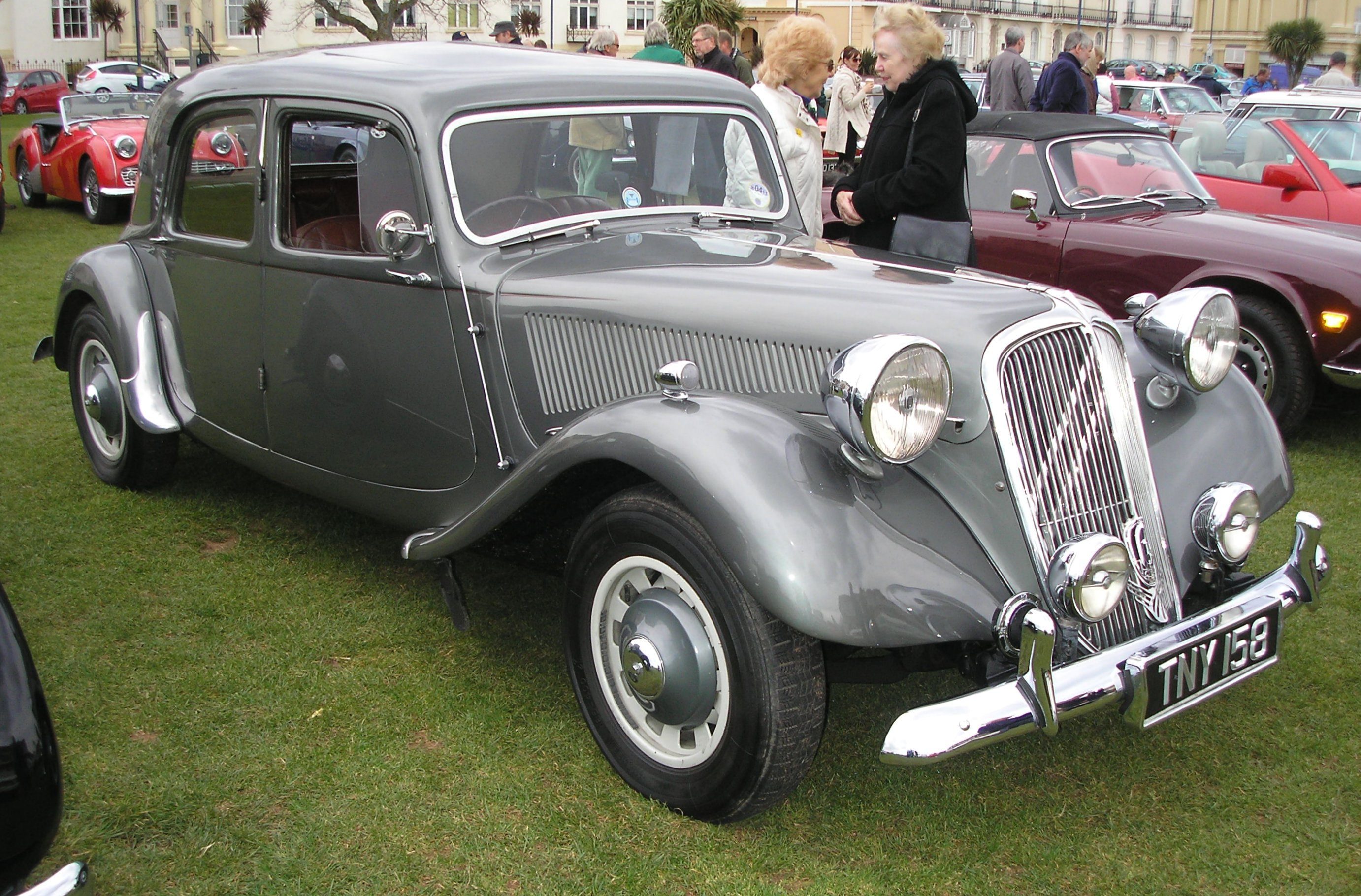
Big Six 6 cylinder (RHD) built in Slough, UK

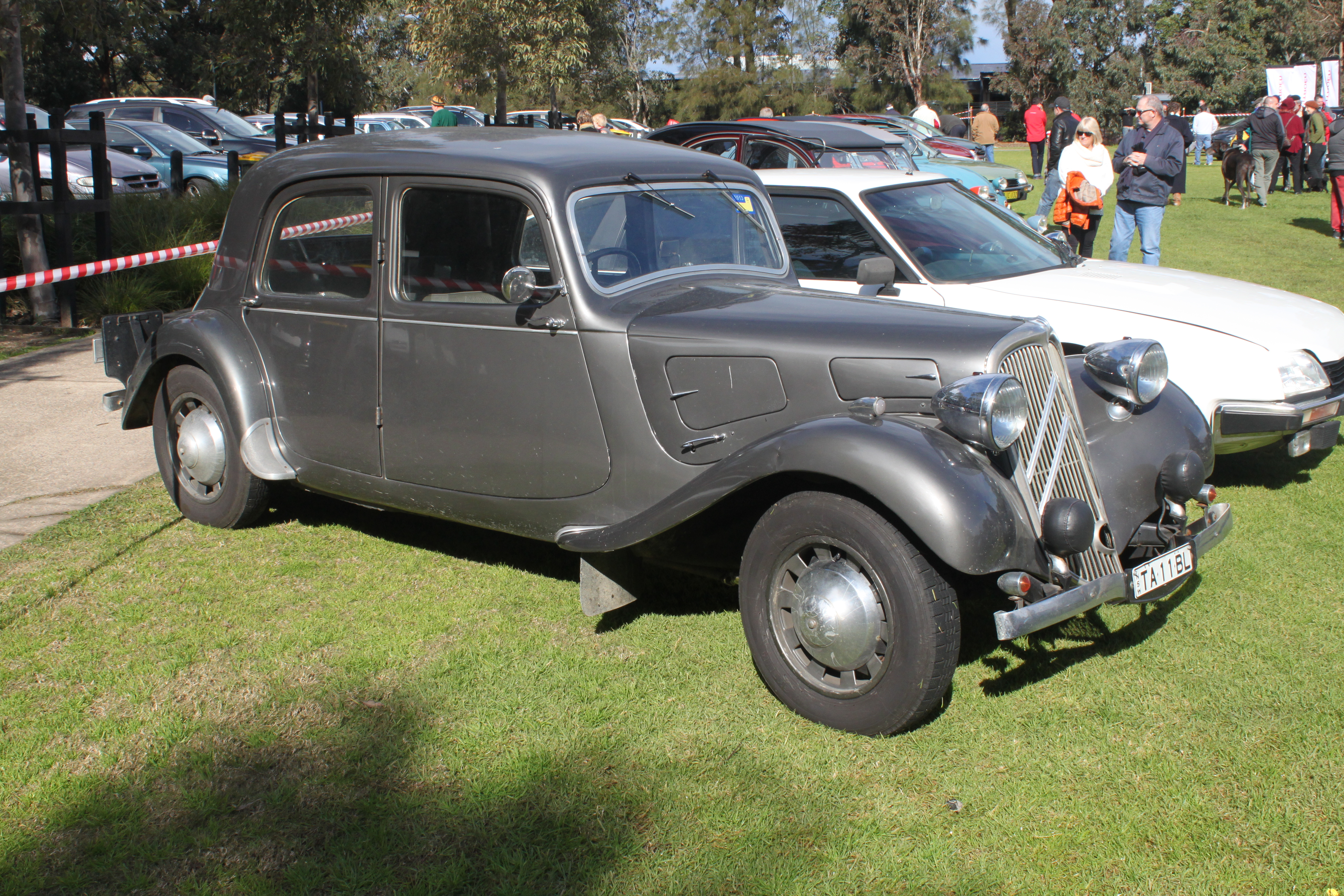
1938 Light Fifteen 4 cylinder (RHD) built in Slough, UK

Right-hand drive cars were built at Slough Trading Estate, England. The Slough version of the 11L was called the Light Fifteen and the long wheelbase 11 was called the Big Fifteen. This confusing terminology referred to the British fiscal tax rating of the time, which was higher than the French, so the 11CV engine was 15HP in England.

The 15/6 model was called Big Six in reference to its 6-cylinder engine.

A 1,911 cc (116.6 cu in) Light Fifteen tested by the British magazine The Motor in 1951 had a top speed of 72.6 mph (116.8 km/h) and could accelerate from 0–60 mph (97 km/h) in 29.7 seconds. A fuel consumption of 25.2 miles per imperial gallon (11.2 L/100 km; 21.0 mpg_{‑US}) was recorded. The test car cost £812 including taxes.

A 2,866 cc (174.9 cu in) six-cylinder model was tested by the same magazine in 1954 and for this car the top speed found was 81.1 mph (130.5 km/h), acceleration from 0–60 mph (97 km/h) 21.2 seconds and fuel consumption 18.6 miles per imperial gallon (15.2 L/100 km; 15.5 mpg_{‑US}). The test car cost £1,349 including taxes.

Models assembled in Slough had to consist of 51 per cent UK parts to make them exempt from the import taxes imposed by the UK government to protect British vehicle manufacturers from foreign competition. The Slough-built cars used 12-volt Lucas electrics, headlights, dynamo and starter. The interior had a walnut dash board with Jaeger instruments, Connolly Leather seats and door panels and a wool headlining. The exterior was fitted with United Kingdom bumpers and over-riders and a chrome grille, with the Citroën chevrons mounted behind. Some were fitted with a sunroof. Most of the Slough-built cars were right-hand drive, although a small number of British specification left-hand drive cars were also built.

== Impact on motorsport ==
Another technical significance of Traction Avant was the cast aluminium alloy transaxle, which was quite radical at the time.

As well as being a considerable part of the weight savings, the manufacturing facility for this transaxle contributed to the below mentioned financial crisis. But when John Cooper looked for a light transaxle case for Formula One rear engine revolution, the Traction Avant unit was about the only candidate, as the Volkswagen magnesium alloy transaxle was much smaller and lacked the space needed to house heftier gears needed for Formula One. The Traction Avant transaxle was used on Cooper T43, which won a F1 championship race as the first mid-mounted engine car to do so in 1958, and on its successors Cooper T45, T51 and T53. Cooper T51 won the GP World Championship in 1959.

Unlike the Volkswagen alloy case used by Hewland, the Traction Avant case could not be used upside down, as the input shaft height was much higher in relation to the output shaft axis so that the oil level needed to lubricate the gears would exceed the then unreliable input shaft oil seal height if used upside down. So the engine needed to sit high above the ground with the oil sump space below, which was not needed by dry-sump racing engines. But the French transaxle was used by several racing car constructors in the late 1950s to 60s with various levels of success.

In the case of Jack Brabham, who personally visited the ERSA foundry in Paris to discuss a possibility to strengthen the case, the transaxle became known as "ERSA Knight" with an additional spur-gear set mounted in the bellhousing spacer (engine to transaxle adapter) suggested by Ron Tauranac, named for Jack Knight who designed the modification and made the straight-cut gears. The height offset created by the spur gear set enabled the engine to sit lower, and became the reason why Cooper T53 was called the 'Lowline', which not only made Brabham the World Champion in 1960 but also became the precursor to the establishment of Brabham as a Formula One constructor.

== Impact on Citroën ==
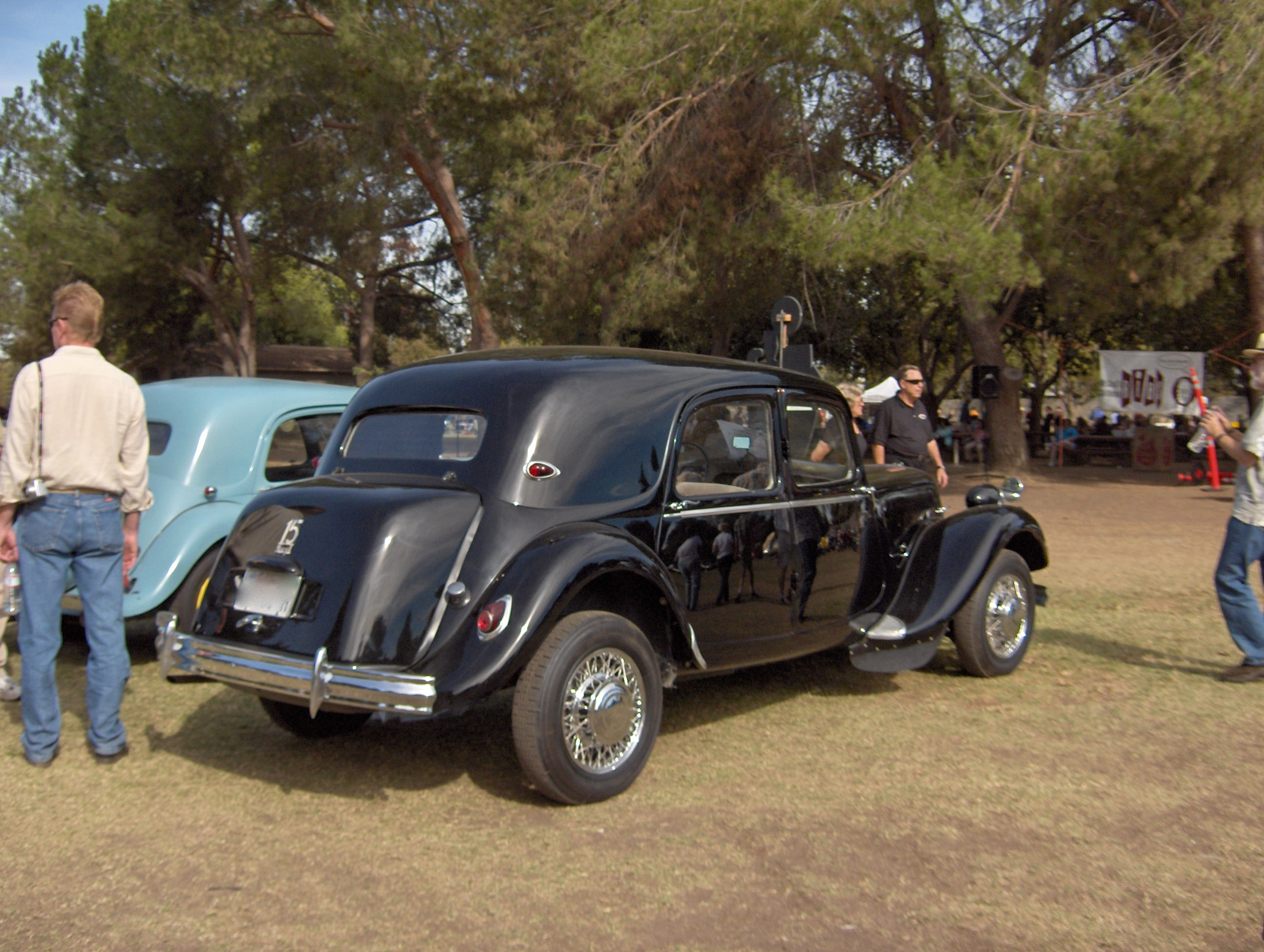
1954 six-cylinder 15/6 with hydropneumatic suspension fitted to the rear wheels – in 'high' position

The development costs of the Traction Avant, combined with the redevelopment of its factory, were very high and Citroën declared bankruptcy in late 1934. The largest creditor was Michelin, who then owned Citroën from 1934 until 1976. Under Michelin, Citroën was run as a research laboratory, a test bed for their radial tires and new automotive technologies.

In 1954, Citroën's experiments with hydropneumatic technology produced its first result, the "15/6 H" – a variant of the 6-cylinder model 15/6 with a self-leveling, height-adjustable rear suspension, a field trial for the DS released the following year.

Directly after the introduction of the Citroën ID, a simplified and more competitively priced version of the expensive DS model, production of the Traction Avant ended in July 1957.

Over 23 years, 759,111 had been built, including 26,400 assembled in Slough in England, 31,750 assembled in Forest near Brussels, 1,823 assembled at Cologne in Germany, and 550 built in Copenhagen, Denmark. The total reflects the production stoppage during World War II.

== Media appearances ==
According to Internet Movie Cars Database, the Traction Avant has made over 1,300 film/TV appearances, including prominent roles in From Russia with love (1963), The Sound of Music (1965) and the French films Army of Shadows (1969) and Diva (1981). It is also seen as the car of the Bordurian agents in Geneva in the Tintin book The Calculus Affair.

== Present day ==
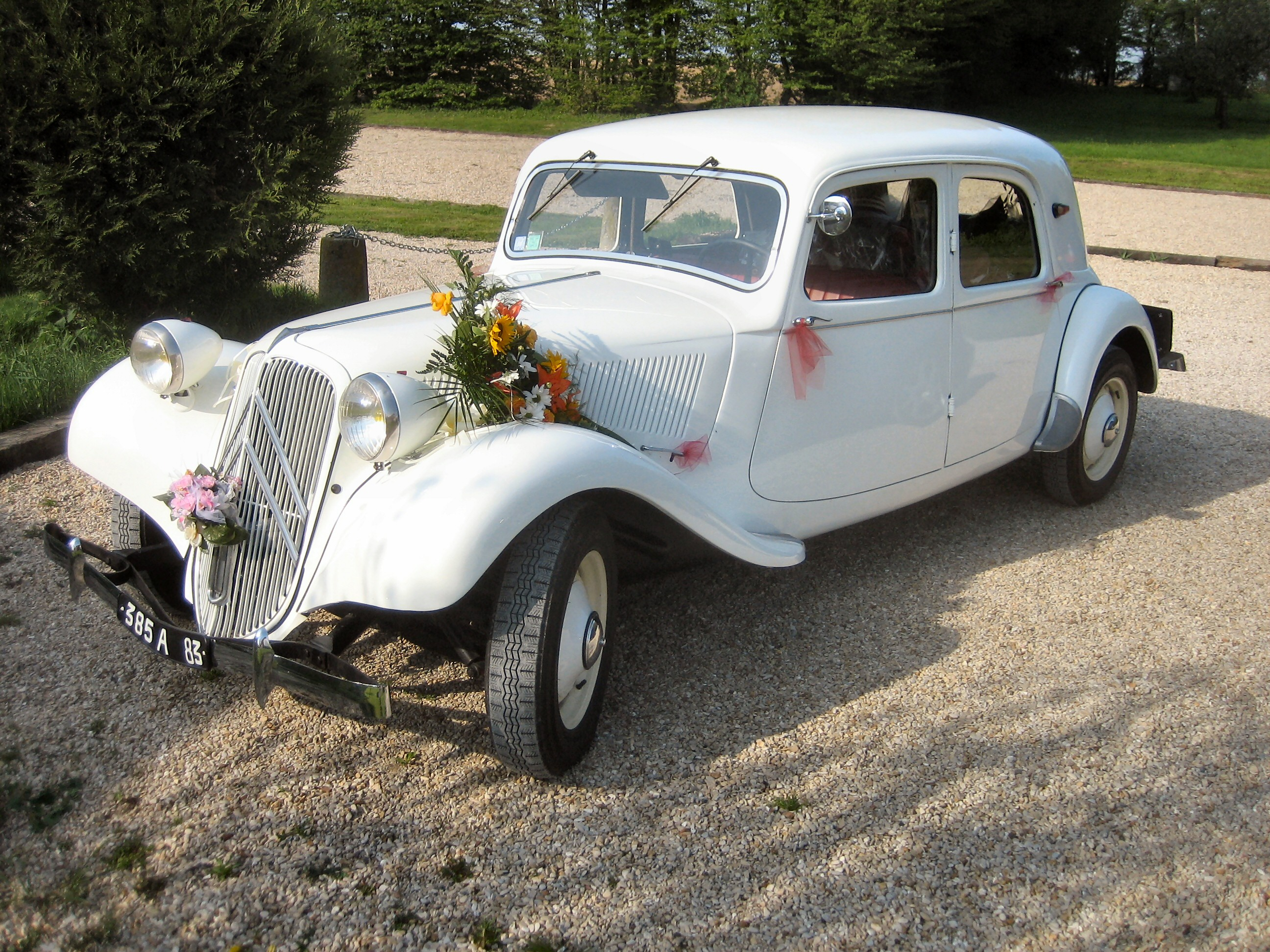
Traction Avant as modern wedding car

In 2006, the oldest surviving 7A has production number ("coque nr") AZ 00–18, and is displayed in partly dismantled shape (engine and front wheels detached) in the Citroën Museum in Paris. The oldest running 7A is probably number AZ-00-23, which was, until 1 September 2006, in possession of a Dutch owner and is now with a Slovenian owner.

Traction Avants are fairly robust vehicles even by modern standards, but they may be prone to leaking water inside the cabin. In 2002 more than 30 Traction Avants drove from Los Angeles to the ICCCR event I in New York City.
