= Flaminio Bertoni =

Italian automobile designer

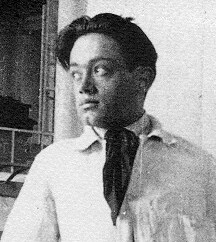
- Born: 10 January 1903; Masnago, Italy
- Died: 7 February 1964 (aged 61); Paris, France

Flaminio Bertoni (Masnago, Italy, 10 January 1903 – Paris, France, 7 February 1964) was an Italian automobile designer from the years preceding World War II until his death in 1964. Before his work in industrial design, Bertoni was a sculptor.

Working at Citroën for decades, Bertoni designed the Traction Avant (1934), 2CV, the H van, the DS, and the Ami 6. The DS was often exhibited at industrial design showcases, such as the 1957 Milan Triennale Exposition, and inspired French coach builder Henri Chapron, who produced coupé and cabriolet versions of the DS.

He died on 7 February 1964 at the age of 61.

In 1961, the French Minister of Culture presented Bertoni with the prestigious Ordre des Arts et des Lettres award. The province of Varese dedicated a museum to his memory. It opened in May 2007. Since 2016, the museum has been located at Volandia Park and Flight Museum.

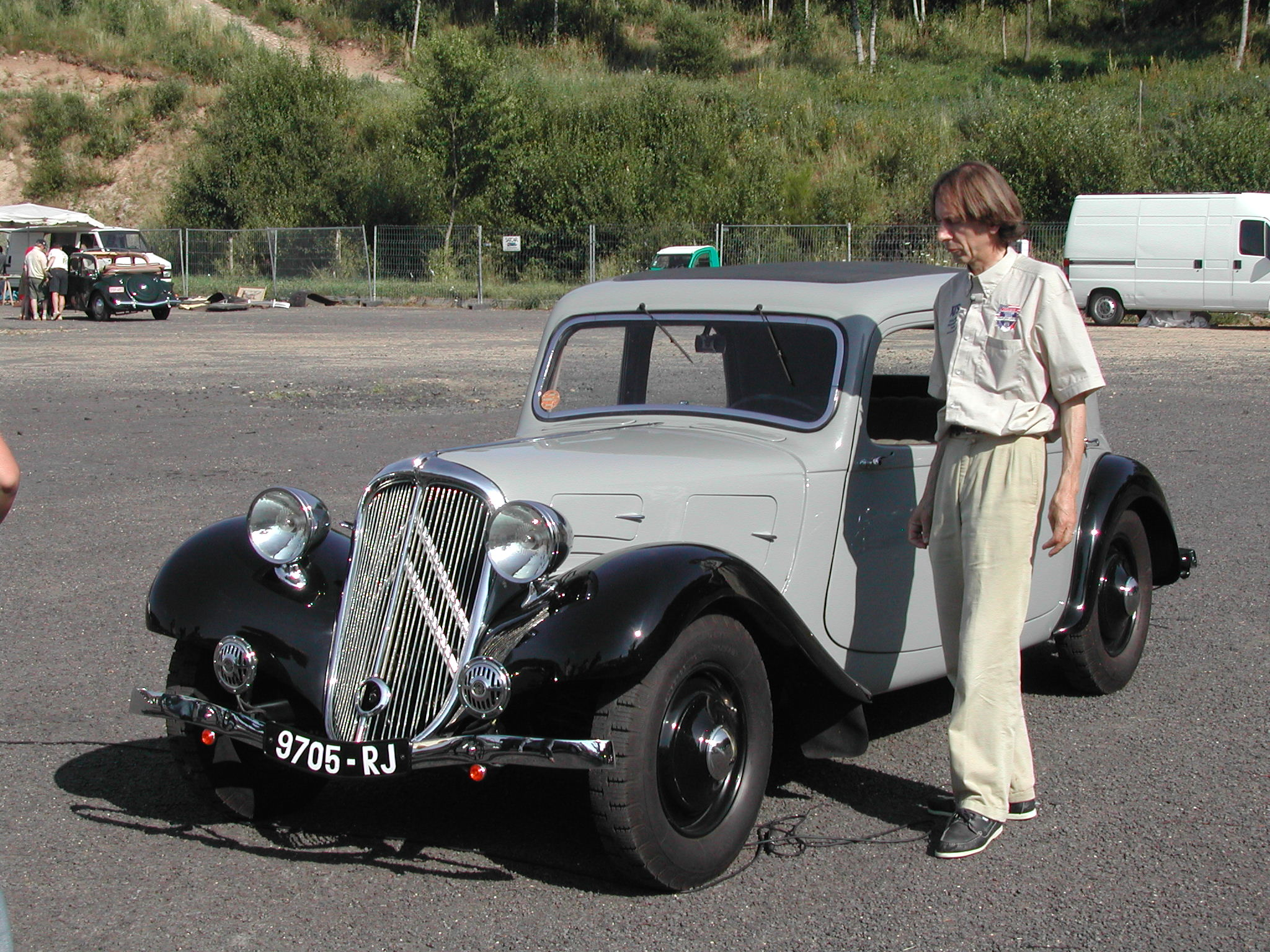
Citroën Traction Avant

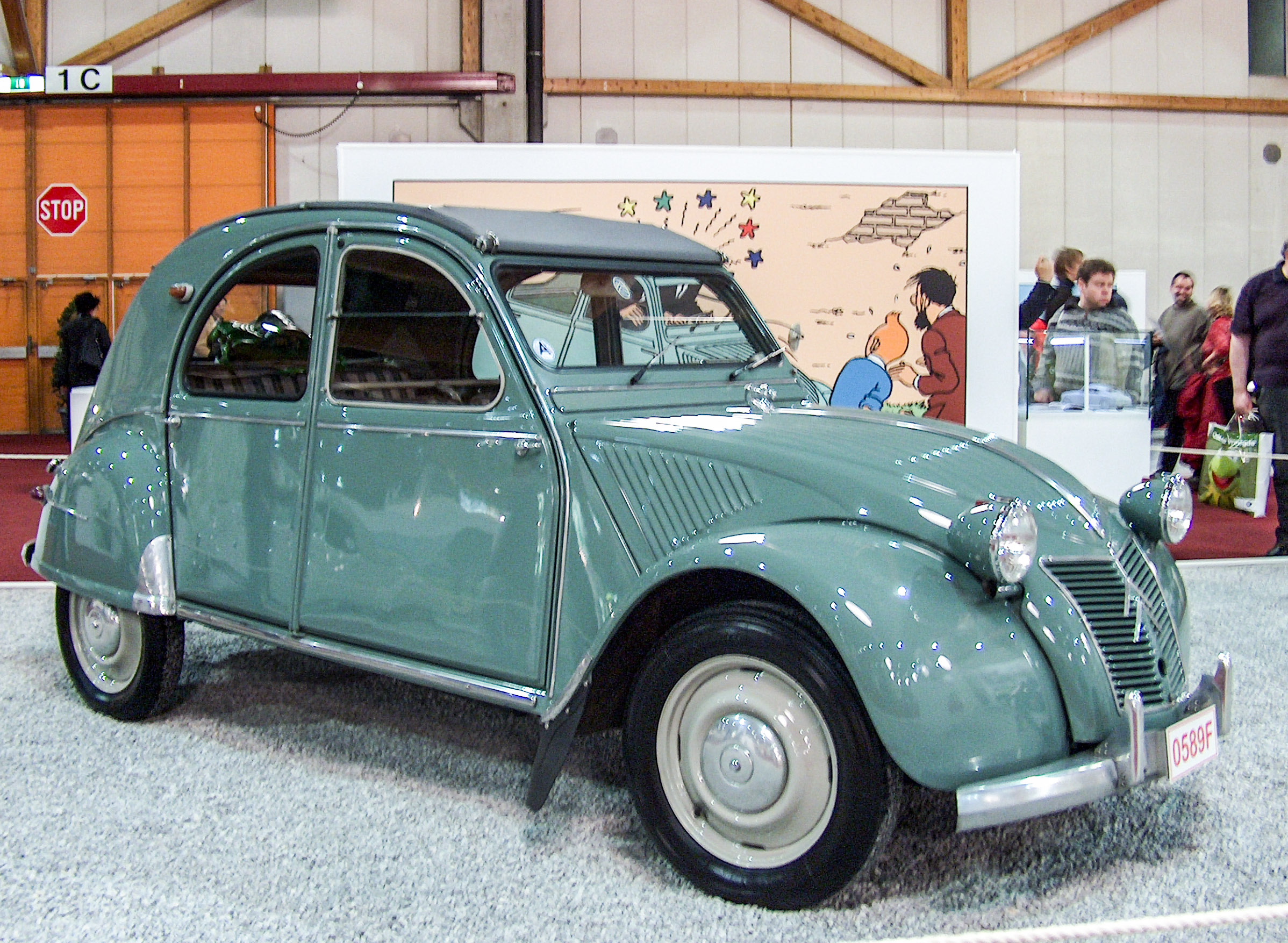
Citroën 2 CV 1949

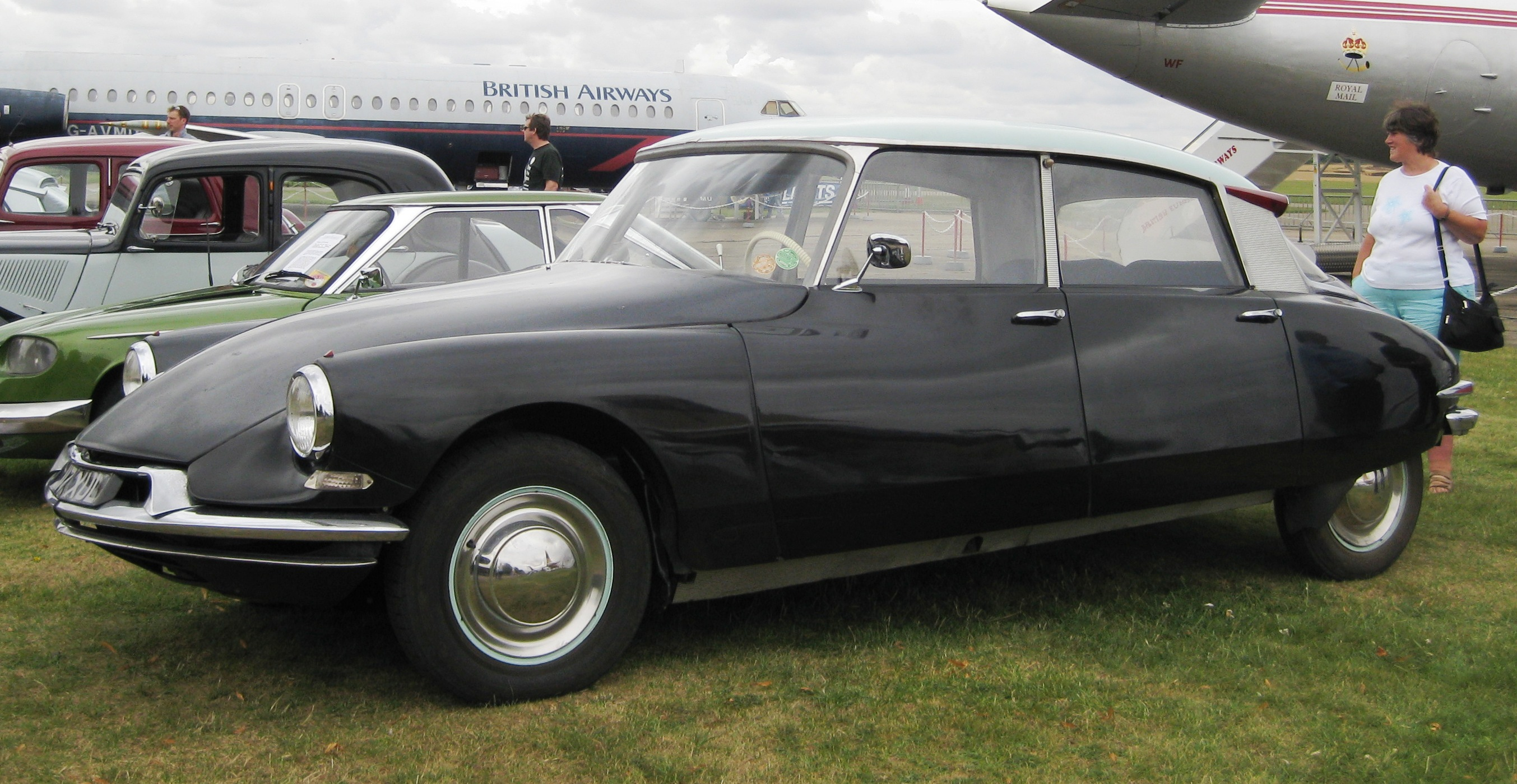
1957 Citroën DS

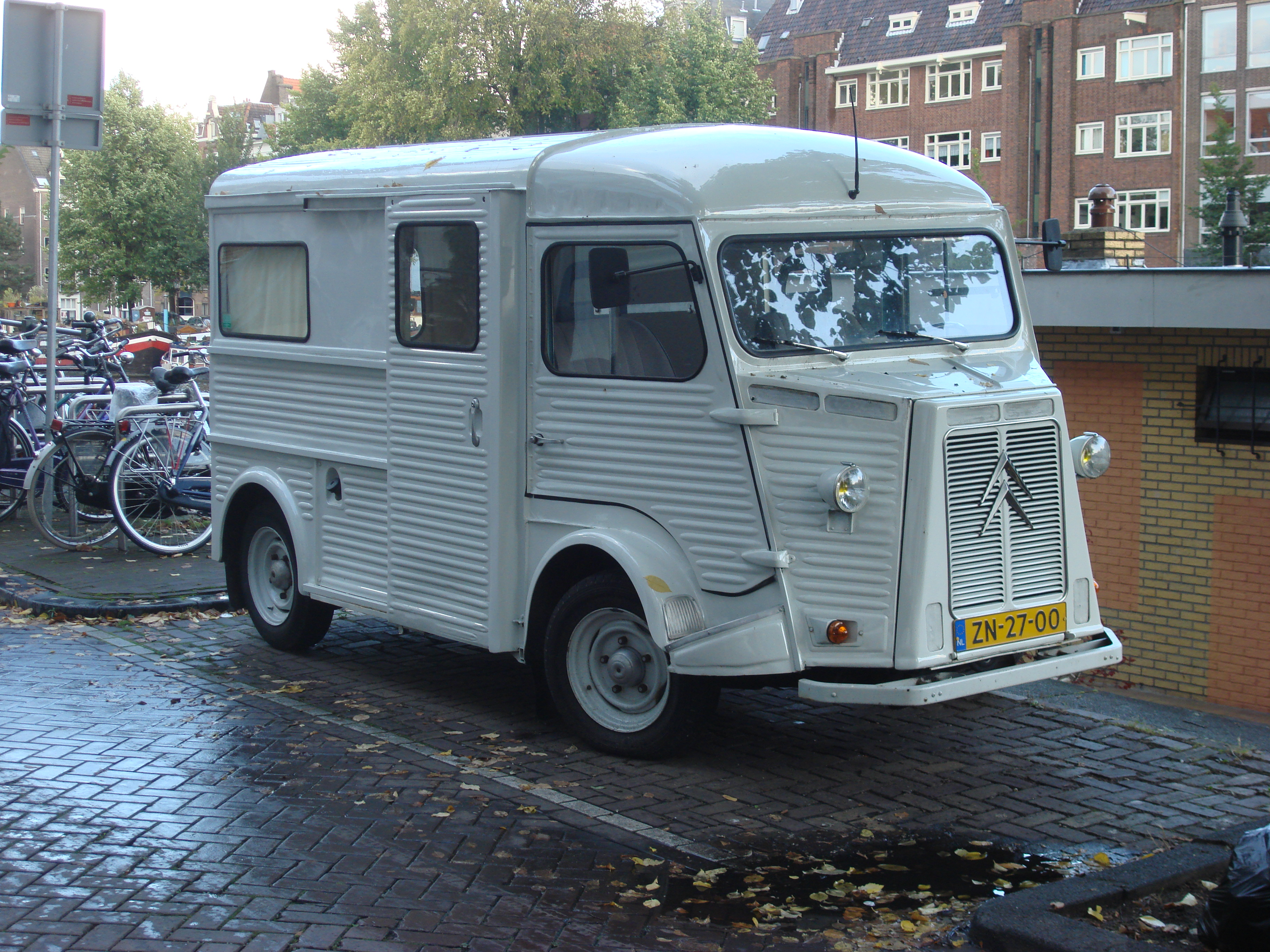
Citroën H Van

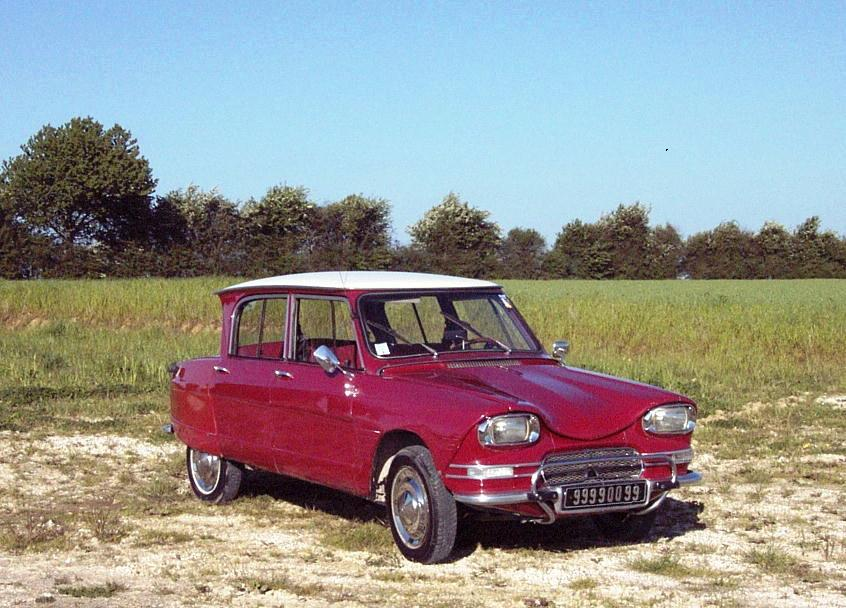
Citroën AMI-6 Sedan
