= List of Citroën vehicles =

The French automobile company Citroën, under Stellantis (formerly FCA and PSA Group) and their successors, have produced numerous cars, listed here ordered by year of introduction.

== Current models ==
Vehicles not sold in the core European market

Model	Introduction	Current model		Vehicle description
Model	Introduction	Introduction	Facelift	Vehicle description
Hatchbacks
C3/e-C3	2002	2024	—	City car (A-segment)
C3 (CC21)	2021	2021	—	City car (A-segment) predominantly in India, Latin America and South East Asia
C4/e-C4	2004	2020	2025	Subcompact crossover coupe SUV (B-segment)
Saloon/liftbacks
C4 X/e-C4 X	2022	2022	2025	Subcompact sedan based by C4 (B-segment)
Station Wagons
C5 X	2021	2021	—	Mid-size estate sold in Europe
SUV/Crossovers
Basalt	2024	2024	—	Subcompact crossover SUV (B-segment) based by C3 Aircross (CC24), predominantly in India, Latin America and South East Asia
C3 Aircross	2010	2024	—	Subcompact crossover SUV (B-segment)
C3 Aircross (CC24)	2023	2023	—	Subcompact crossover SUV (B-segment) predominantly in India, Latin America and South East Asia
C5 Aircross	2017	2025	—	Compact crossover SUV (C-segment)
Quadricycles
Ami	2020	2020	2025	Battery electric quadricycle, with 2-seats
MPV/passenger vans
SpaceTourer/e-SpaceTourer	2015	2015	2023	Passenger version of Jumpy
Berlingo/e-Berlingo	1996	2018	2023	Passenger version of Berlingo
Vans
Berlingo	1996	2018	2023	Commercial van
Jumpy	1994	2015	2023	Light commercial vehicle
Jumper	1993	2006	2024	Light commercial vehicle

== Former models ==
Image	Model Name	Introduction	Discontinued	Segment	Body Style	Predecessor	Successor	Notes
Cars
	7U	1935	1938	E	4-door sedan	Citroën Rosalie		
	2CV	1948	1990	B	4-door sedan 5-door hatchback 2-door panel van pickup coupé utility		Citroën Dyane	
	Ami	1961	1978	B	4-door sedan 5-door estate 2-door van		Citroën Axel Citroën Visa	
	Axel	1984	1988	B	3-door hatchback	Citroën Ami Citroën Dyane	Citroën AX	
	AX	1986	1998	B	3/5-door hatchback	Citroën LNA Citroën Axel Citroën Visa	Citroën Saxo	
	Bijou	1959	1964	B	2-door coupe			Small coupe based on 2CV
	BX	1982	1994	D	5-door hatchback 5-door estate	Citroën GS	Citroën Xantia	
	CX	1974	1991	E	4-door fastback 5-door estate	Citroën DS	Citroën XM	
	C-Crosser	2007	2012	J	5-door SUV	Citroën Méhari Citroën FAF	Citroën C4 Aircross	
	C1	2005	2021	A	3/5-door hatchback			
	C2	2003	2009	B	3-door hatchback	Citroën Saxo	DS 3	
	C3 Picasso	2009	2017	M	5-door estate	Citroën Xsara Picasso	Citroën C3 Aircross	
	C3L	2020	2021	B	4-door sedan	n/a		Crossover sedan version of the C3-XR.
	C3-XR	2014	2023	J	5-door SUV	Citroën C2		
	C4 & C6	1928	1934	E	4-door sedan	Citroën Type B12		Names later used for the Citroën C4 and Citroën C6 of the 21st century.
	C4 Coupe	2004	2010	C	3-door coupe		DS 4	
	C4 Picasso	2007	2020	M	5-door compact MPV	Citroën Xsara Picasso	Citroën C5 Aircross	
	C4 Aircross	2012	2017	J	5-door SUV	Citroën C-Crosser	Citroën C5 Aircross	
	C4 Cactus	2014	2024	J	5-door SUV	Citroën C4 Aircross	Citroën C3 Aircross	
	C-Triomphe	2006	2016	E	4-door sedan		Citroën C4 Lounge	Mid-size produced exclusively for the Chinese market.
	C-Elysée	2012	2022	B	4-door saloon	Citroën Elysée	Citroën C4 X	
	C4	2004	2018	C	4-door Sedan; 5-door Hatchback; 3-door Coupe	Xsara	C4	Compact Car.
	C4 Sedan	2007	2022	C	4-door Sedan			
	C5 Tourer	2008	2017	D	5-door estate			Station wagon version of the C5.
	C5	2000	2017	D	4-door Sedan	Xantia	C5 X	Large Family Car.
	C6	2005	2012	E	4-door fastback	Citroën XM	DS 9	Executive Car.
	C6 II	2016	2023	E	4-door sedan	Citroën C6		
	C8	2002	2014	M	5-door minivan	Citroën Evasion	Citroën Grand C4 Picasso	Part of the second-generation Eurovans along with the Peugeot 807, Fiat Ulysse, and Lancia Phedra.
	Dyane	1967	1983	B	5-door hatchback	Citroën 2CV	Citroën Visa Citroën Axel	
	DS	1955	1975	E	4-door sedan 5-door estate 2-door cabriolet	Citroën Traction Avant	Citroën CX	
	DS 3	2009	2015	B	3-door hatchback	Citroën C2		Moved to DS brand.
	DS 4	2010	2015	C	5-door hatchback	Citroën C4 Coupe		Moved to DS brand.
	DS 5	2011	2015	D	5-door hatchback			Moved to DS brand.
	E-Méhari	2016	2019	J	2-door convertible SUV	Citroën C3 Pluriel		
	Evasion	1994	2002	M	5-door minivan		Citroën C8	Part of the first-generation Eurovans along with the Peugeot 806, Fiat Ulysse, and Lancia Zeta.
	FAF	1977	1981	J	0/2-door SUV		Citroën C-Crosser	
	Fukang	1994	2009	C	4-door sedan 5-door hatchback 2-door panel van 4-door pickup		Citroën Elysée	Manufactured by Dongfeng Peugeot-Citroën.
	Grand C4 SpaceTourer	2006	2022	M	5-door compact MPV	Citroën C8		
	GS / GSA	1970	1986	C	4-door sedan 5-door hatchback 5-door estate 3-door van		Citroën ZX	
	ID	1957	1970	E	4-door sedan			Cheaper variant of the DS
	LN / LNA	1976	1986	A	3-door hatchback	Citroën Dyane	Citroën AX	
	M35	1969	1971	B	2-door coupe		Citroën LNA	Small coupe based on Ami 8.
	Méhari	1968	1988	J	2-door convertible SUV		Citroën C-Crosser	
	Nemo Multispace	2008	2017	M	5-door MPV			Rebadged Fiat Fiorino passenger van.
	Rosalie	1932	1938	E	4-door sedan	Citroën C4 & C6	Citroën Traction Avant	
	Saxo	1996	2004	B	3/5-door hatchback	Citroën AX	Citroën C2 Citroën C3	
	SM	1970	1975	S	3-door hatchback coupe			
	Synergie	1994	2002	M	5-door minivan			Right-hand-drive version of the Evasion.
	Traction Avant	1934	1957	E	4-door sedan 2-door sedan 2-door cabriolet 5-door hatchback	Citroën Rosalie Citroën C4 & C6	Citroën DS	
	Type A	1919	1921	D	torpedo		Citroën Type B2	
	Type B2	1921	1926	D	torpedo	Citroën Type A	Citroën Type B10	
	Type B10	1924	1925	D	torpedo	Citroën Type B2	Citroën Type B12	
	Type B12	1925	1927	D	torpedo	Citroën Type B10		
	Type C	1922	1926	D	torpedo convertible			
	Visa	1978	1988	B	5-door hatchback 4-door cabriolet	Citroën Ami Citroën Dyane	Citroën AX	
	XM	1989	2000	E	5-door liftback 5-door estate	Citroën CX	Citroën C6	
	Xantia	1992	2002	D	5-door hatchback 5-door estate	Citroën BX	Citroën C5	
	Xsara	1997	2006	C	3/5-door hatchback 5-door estate	Citroën ZX	Citroën C4	
	Xsara Picasso	1999	2013	M	5-door compact MPV		Citroën C3 Picasso Citroën C4 Picasso	
	ZX	1990	1998	C	3/5-door hatchback 5-door estate	Citroën GS	Citroën Xsara	
Commercial
	Acadiane	1977	1987	M	small van	Citroën 2CV Utility	Citroën C15	Light van based on Dyane.
	Belphégor	1964	1972	M	medium truck	Citroën U23		
	C15	1984	2005	M	panel van	Citroën Acadiane	Citroën Berlingo	Light van based on Visa.
	C25	1981	1993	M	3-door van/minibus	Citroën C35	Citroën Jumper	Rebadged Fiat Ducato.
	C35	1974	1992	M	3-door van	Citroën H Van	Citroën C25	Rebadged Fiat 242.
	H Van	1947	1981	M	4-door panel van	Citroën TUB	Citroën C25 Citroën C35	
	Nemo	2008	2017	M	3-door panel van		Citroën Berlingo	Rebadged Fiat Fiorino.
	TUB / TUC	1939	1941	M	light van		Citroën H Van	
	U23	1936	1963	M	light truck		Citroën Belphégor	Light truck based on Traction Avant.

== Alternative fueled ==
Citroën Alternative propulsion includes the following:

=== Biofuels ===
Biofuel Citroëns include the Citroën C4 BioFlex (bioethanol flexible fuel vehicle).

=== Electric and hybrid vehicles ===
In the earlier years, electric cars were produced, e.g. the AX electrique, Saxo electrique etc. but in smaller series.

In the hybrid electric vehicle strategy there are four concept cars HYmotion at the Paris Motor Show 2008: Hypnos, illustrating the latest breakthroughs in this field with the hybrid technology HYmotion4; the C4 HYmotion2 and C-Cactus (diesel-electric hybrid), reflecting Citroën's plans to integrate this promising solution in affordable mass-market vehicles; and the C4 WRC HYmotion4, extending ecological principles to sports cars.

Citroën showed the plug-in hybrid REVOLTe at the 2009 Frankfurt Motorshow.

== Concept cars ==
Citroën has produced numerous concept cars over the decades, previewing future design trends or technologies. Notable concepts include the Citroën Karin (1980), Citroën Activa (1988), Citroën C-Métisse (2006), GT by Citroën (2008) and Citroën Survolt (2010).

== 4x4 Conversions ==
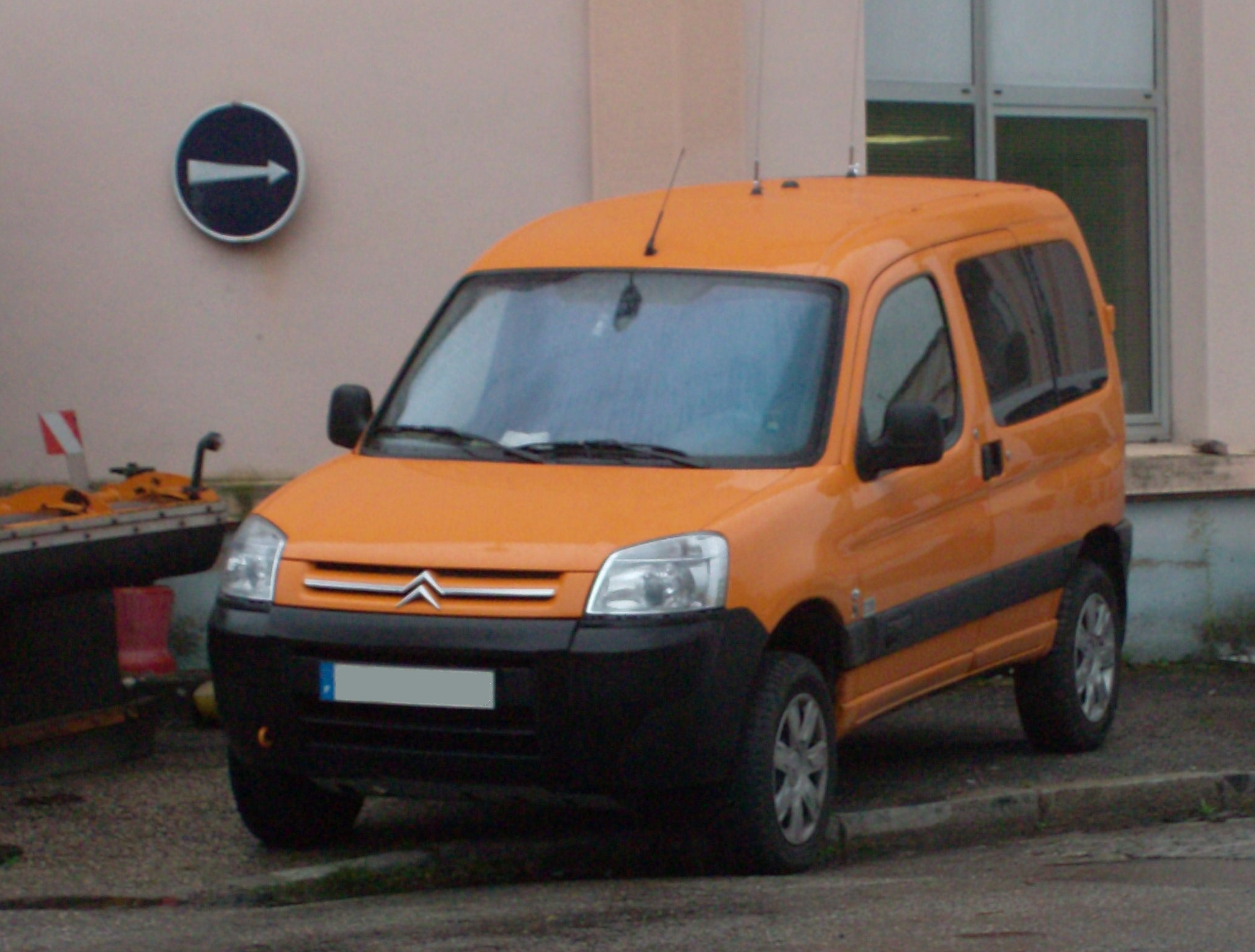
Citroën Berlingo with Dangel 4x4 system

Dangel, a French specialist automobile company based in Sentheim, Alsace, has produced 4x4 versions of Citroën and Peugeot vehicles since 1980. Its first conversion was the Peugeot 504. Dangel currently produces 4x4 conversions of the Citroën Berlingo, the Citroën Jumper and the Citroën Jumpy.

== Aircraft ==
In the early 1970s Citroën investigated the possibility of producing helicopters with the Wankel engines manufactured by its subsidiary Comotor. A single helicopter prototype known as the Citroën RE2 was built.
