= Citroën Type B10 =

Citroën Type B10 10CV
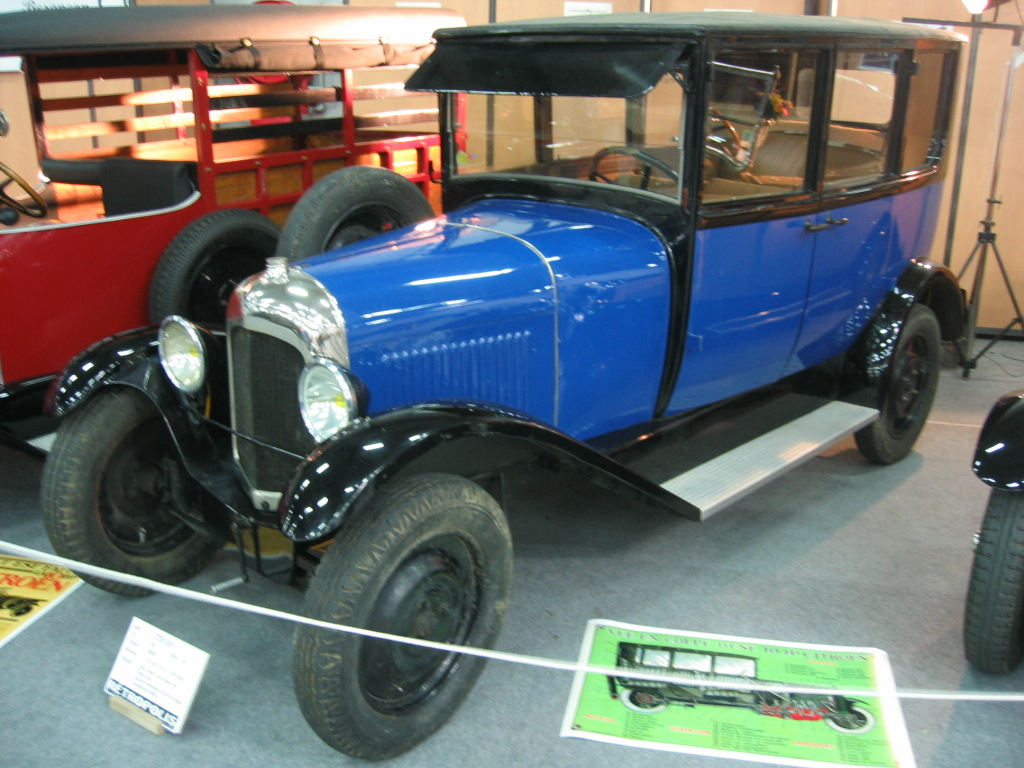
- Citroën B10 with "tout acier" (all-steel) "Conduite Intérieure" (saloon/sedan) bodywork

Overview
- Manufacturer: Citroën
- Production: 1924–1925; 17,259 produced
- Assembly: Parc André Citroën, Quai de Javel, Vaugirard, Paris, France

Body and chassis
- Body style: "Torpedo" "Conduite Intérieure" (saloon/sedan)
- Layout: FR layout

Powertrain
- Engine: Petrol/gasoline: 1,452cc Straight-4
- Transmission: 3-speed manual

Dimensions
- Wheelbase: 2,830 millimetres (111.4 in)
- Length: 3,680–4,000 millimetres (145–157 in)

Chronology
- Predecessor: Citroën Type B2
- Successor: Citroën Type B12; Citroën C4 & C6

The Citroën B10 is an automobile produced by Citroën at André Citroën's factory in central Paris between 1924 and 1925.

The B10 was manufactured using modern mass production technologies which were applied by Citroën and still, at this point, by no other French auto-maker; although by now, across the river Rhine, Opel were also copying the assembly line approach (and also copying one of Citroën's models).

The Citroën B10 was in many respects similar to the manufacturer's B2 model. What marks it out as different is its use of an "all-steel" ("tout-acier") body. The B10 was the first European car maker to apply the pressed steel technologies, developed by Ambi-Budd, and which during the next fifteen years would transform the economics of automobile production across Europe.

== Context ==
The Citroën B10 shared its chassis and engine with the B2, and was produced in parallel with that car. Both models were replaced by the Citroën Type B12 which made its first public appearance at the 19th Paris Motor Show in October 1924.

== Car ==
The size of the 4-cylinder engine remained at 1,452 cc, and as with the earlier model, the B10 was sometimes known as the Citroën 10CV (or 10HP), the HP in the suffix being a reference to its fiscal power, a number computed according to the cylinder diameters and used to define its taxation class. From October 1924 all Citroën came with "comfort tyres" ("pneus confort") included in the price.

The "Type B10" exhibited at the show in October 1924 used a "Conduite Intérieure" (two-box saloon/sedan) all-steel body and was priced by the manufacturer at 25,000 francs. Citroën's "Torpedo" bodied version of its 10HP model still came with a traditional timber frame body and was accordingly designed a "Type B2": this car was listed by the manufacturer at 18,000 francs. The price of the "Torpedo" bodied car rose to 19,000 francs and it became a "Type B10" in spring of 1925 when it, too, received "all-steel" bodywork.

By way of comparison Peugeot, were offering in the same class their 10HP "Type 177BH" for 16,900 francs in bare chassis form, but adding a closed body "Conduite Intérieure" would have been likely to take the price of the Peugeot approximately to the price band as the occupied by the "Conduite Intérieure" steel-bodied "Type B10". Most other auto-makers in this sector were listing significantly higher prices for a 10 HP model, although the "Torpedo" bodied 10 HP Amilcar "Type E", was not too far from the same price band, at only 27,900 francs, even in its newly announced extended wheelbase form.

== All-steel body ==
Till 1924 car bodies - even those of mass-produced Citroëns - were made according to methods derived directly from the carriage trade, using a timber-frame. Each piece of the frame was individually shaped, normally from ash or beech wood, using traditional carpenters' tools. Sheets of steel (or, in some cases, of fabric) were attached to the outside of the timber frame to cover and protect both the frame and the interior of the automobile from the weather, but the steel sheets added no significant structural strength to that already provided by the timber frame. In fact the first steel bodied "Type B10" cars were subject to significant flexing and distortion that damaged the company's reputation, but these were overcome through the addition of steel reinforcements: any reputational damage was short-lived, and by 1928 sales of the 10 HP "B-series" Citroën, by now in its "Type B12" incarnation, were higher than ever.

In 1923, Citroën returned to United States, where this time he began a business relationship with American engineer Edward Gowen Budd. From 1899, Budd had worked to develop stainless steel bodies for railroad cars, for the Pullman in particular. Budd went on to manufacture steel bodies for many automakers, Dodge being his first big auto client. In Europe the Citroën B10 was the first car to use an "all-steel" ("tout-acier") body. Although individual flat sheets of steel were structurally weak and prone to deform under pressure, once a steel sheet was stamped into a three-dimensional shape it became much more rigid, and by welding a number of these three-dimensional sheets together it became possible to create a car body stronger than a traditional timber framed car body, but one that weighed much less, so that the cars that used all steel bodies could be powered by smaller cheaper engines, or else provide more speed and better fuel economy.

"All-steel" car bodies transformed the look, the noise and the smell car factories. They also transformed the economics of making cars. The heavy presses needed to make the steel panels were expensive, which was leading to a situation in Germany whereby many auto-makers would soon be buying their car bodies from one Ambi-Budd factory in Berlin. In France larger auto-makers, starting with Citroën, but fairly soon followed by Peugeot and Renault (who got themselves into an acrimonious litigation with Ambi-Budd over alleged patent infringements) invested in order to establish their own press-shops. Regardless of whether the bodies came from an Ambi-Budd factory in Berlin or were stamped using presses in the manufacturer's own premises, further heavy investment was needed for the dies to make the individual panels which more often than not were different for each car model. Nevertheless, once that investment in pressing equipment had been incurred, the individual cars bodies were much quicker and cheaper to produce than the old timber framed horseless carriages. By 1928 the B10's "all-steel" bodied successor, the B12, was being produced at the rate of 400 cars per day, and accounted for 30% of the cars produced in France at the time. The challenge, not just for the auto-makers, but also for their accountants, bankers and other investors, involved record creation and paying to amortize the up-front capital cost over a series of cars that might be in production for five years or more. Provided that the burden of financing the initial capital investment could be sustained until it had been paid off through the production and sale of sufficient cars, producing cars with all-steel bodies could be very profitable, with the added bonus that France's second tier auto-makers would never be able to contemplate the capital investment necessary, so that through the later 1920s and 1930s the leading automakers in the volume sector relentlessly gained market share while smaller competitors fell by the wayside. The troubled state of Citroën's finances during the ten-year run-up to their 1935 bankruptcy, and the relative dearth of major model changes involving new bodywork, suggest that Citroën and their bankers struggled to master the cost implications of being the first auto-maker in Europe to build cars using all-steel car bodies. Citroën's survival, following its bankruptcy, under Michelin ownership, as one of the leading French car makers between 1935 and 1974 nevertheless was only possible because they were one of a handful of French automakers that adopted the "all-steel" car body technology having launched the chassis-less unibody Citroën Traction Avant.

== Classification in the French tax and insurance system ==
The car, like its two predecessors, was a 10 HP (10 CV).

== Book list ==
- Jacques Wolgensinger, André Citroën, Lupetti, ISBN 88-85838-69-3
- J.P. Foucault, Le 90 ans de Citroën, Éditions Michel Lafon, ISBN 978-2-7499-1088-8
- AA.VV., Citroën 1919-2006 - La storia e i modelli, Editoriale Domus
