= Citroën C4 & C6 =

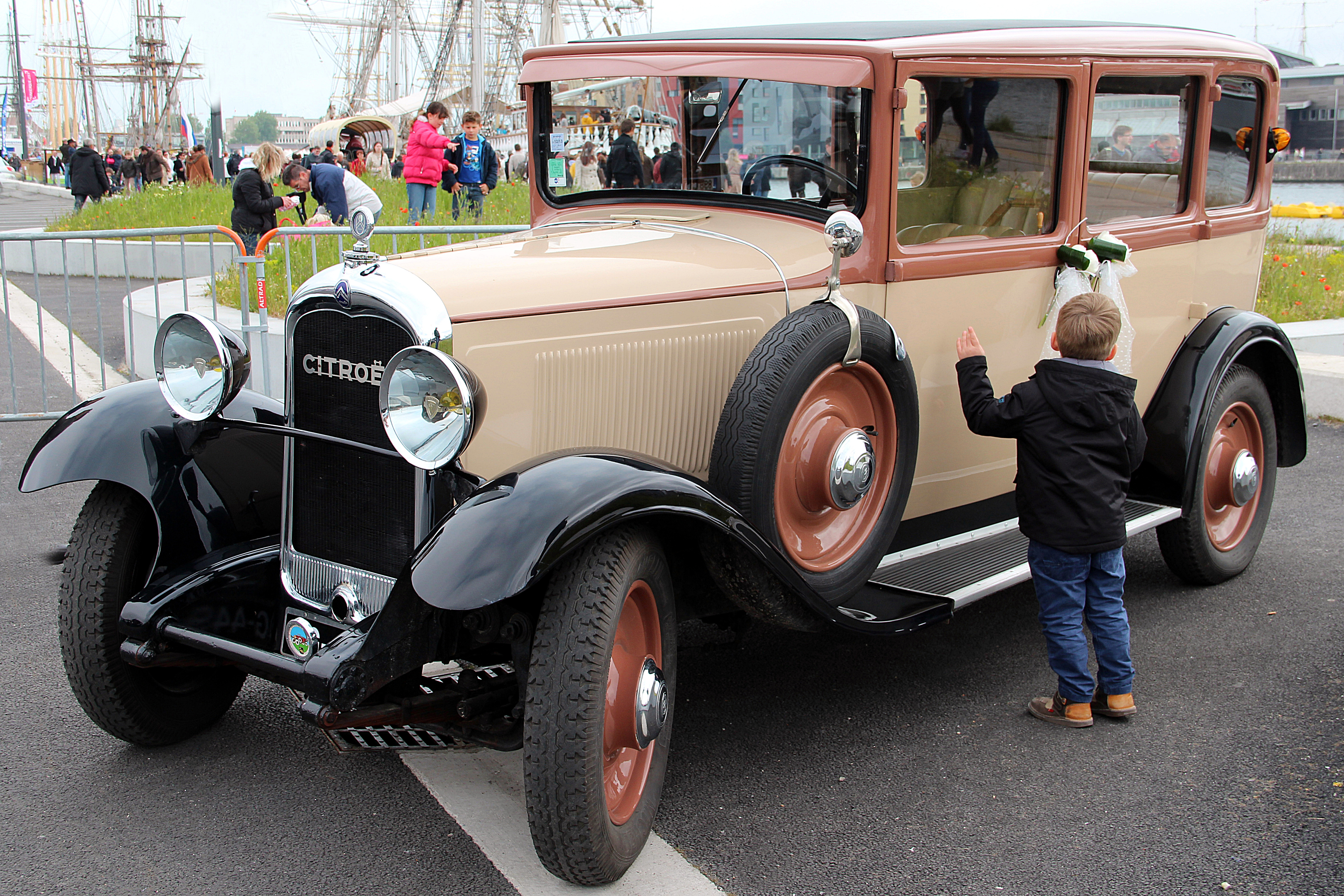

Overview
- Manufacturer: Citroën
- Production: 1928–1932
- Assembly: Parc André Citroën, Quai de Javel, Vaugirard, Paris, France

Body and chassis
- Body style: 2-door sedan 4-door sedan 4-door sedan delivery 2-door coupe utility
- Layout: FR layout

Powertrain
- Engine: Petrol: 1.3 L Straight-4
- Transmission: 3-speed manual

Dimensions
- Wheelbase: 119 in (3,023 mm)
- Length: 183.1 in (4,651 mm)

Chronology
- Predecessor: Citroën Type A Citroën Type B14
- Successor: Citroën Traction Avant; Citroën Type 23 (commercial models)

The Citroën C4 and C6 models were designed to replace the Citroën Type A 10 hp and Citroën Type B model family cars. The styling of the two models was said to be heavily influenced by American counterparts of the same time period, however in France, the new model was considered just that: new.

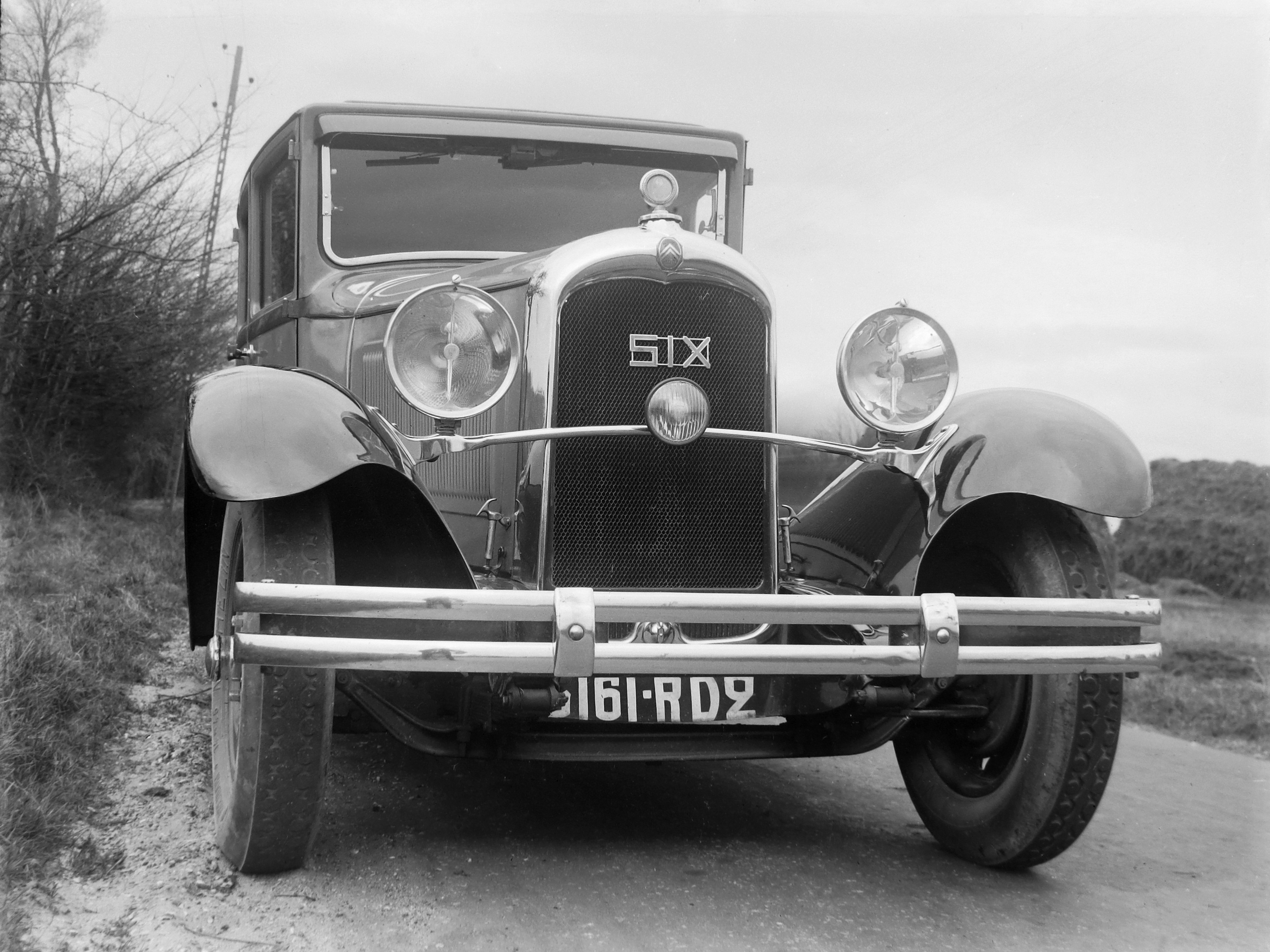
Citroën Type C6

The traditional grille styles of previous Citroën models were abandoned and a sleeker, flatter grille was used. There were numerous options in terms of body styles, including a particularly popular commercial line. These nameplates were later used for the Citroën C4 and the Citroën C6 in the 21st century, although being classified into the different class. Sedan delivery and coupe utility vehicles were also produced under the Type AC4 index, in the basis of these vehicles, but were eventually replaced by the Citroën Type 23 trucks.

== Classification in the French tax and insurance system ==
C4: The four-cylinder had 9 CV. Only the last remaining stocks were sold as C4 VIII and these received the weaker engine of the successor Rosalie with 8 CV.

C6: The six-cylinder had 14 CV. Only the C6S ("Sport"), which was only built with 13 copies and the C6G had 15 CV.

== Gallery ==
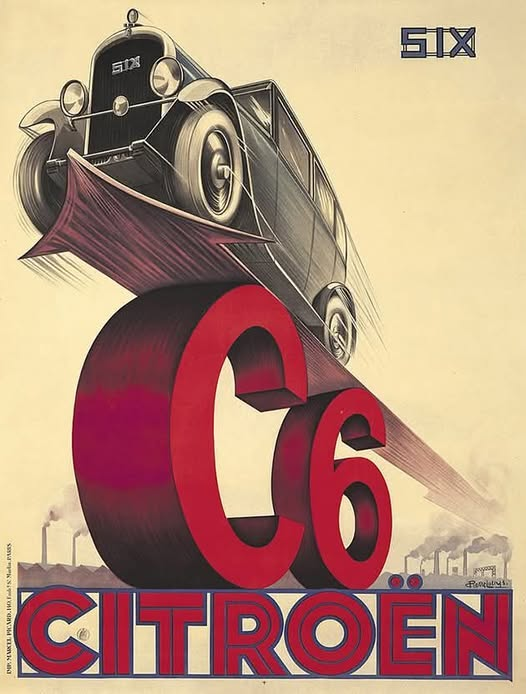
Advertisement for the 1928 Citroën C6
