= Citroën Type B2 =

Citroën Type B2 10CV
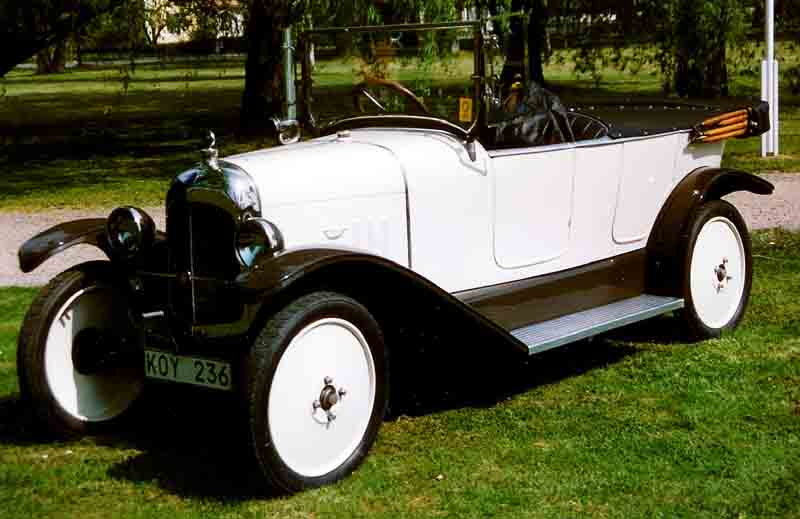

Overview
- Manufacturer: Citroën
- Production: 1921–1926; 89,841 produced
- Assembly: Quai de Javel, Vaugirard, Paris, France

Body and chassis
- Body style: 25 different bodies, but concentration was on relatively few, including: "Torpedo" "Torpedo Sport" "Conduite Intérieure" (saloon/sedan) "Coupé De Ville" ("Town car"); Sport
- Layout: FR layout

Powertrain
- Engine: Petrol/gasoline: 1,452cc Straight-4
- Transmission: 3-speed manual

Dimensions
- Wheelbase: 2,830 millimetres (111.4 in)
- Length: 3,940 millimetres (155.1 in)

Chronology
- Predecessor: Citroën Type A
- Successor: Citroën Type B10

The Citroën B2 is the second model produced by Citroën. It is therefore the second European car to have been constructed according to modern mass production technologies. It was produced at André Citroën's factory in central Paris between May 1921 and July 1926.

== Context ==
The Citroën B2 replaced the Citroën Type A in June 1921, although the "Type A" would continue to be listed for sale till December 1921.

== The car ==
The new car offered more power, the size of its four-cylinder engine now being increased to 1,452 cc. The car was sometimes known as the Citroën 10CV (10HP), the CV in the suffix being a reference to its fiscal power, a number computed according to the cylinder diameters and used to define its taxation class. In terms of engine power, maximum output was listed as 20 hp (15 kW) at 2,100 rpm, which translated into a claimed top speed of 72 km/h (45 mph). Power reached the rear wheels via a three-speed manual transmission. There was no synchromesh.

Advertised fuel consumption was 8 l/100 km (35 mpg_{‑imp}; 29 mpg_{‑US}). The car quickly gained a reputation for robustness and economy.

== Production ==
The car was manufactured, just five minutes from the Eiffel Tower, in the 15th arrondissement of central Paris at the famous factory in the Quai de Javel (subsequently renamed Quai André-Citroën), which by 1925 was producing at the rate of 200 cars per day, applying techniques then known as "Taylorism" which André Citroën had studied personally and in depth during a visit to Dearborn that he had undertaken during the war in order to master the techniques being applied by Henry Ford for the production of the Model T.

== Further developments and the Citroën B10 ==
At the Paris Motor Show in October 1924 a Citroën 10CV was exhibited with "tout-acier" ("all-steel") body work. Initially this model was offered only with a "Conduite Intérieure" (closed saloon/sedan) body, although a "Torpedo" bodied version was added during the spring of 1925. For the 1925 model year the "all-steel" bodied car came to be designated as the Citroën B10, while cars with bodies using the (at this stage near universal for passenger cars) coach-builders' approach of constructing car bodies by attaching panels – often steel panels – to a stout hand-crafted timber frame continued to be designated as the Citroën B2. As the year progressed, "Type B2" car bodies appeared that incorporated features of the "all-steel" "Type B10" such as the three seater cabriolet that appeared in the summer of 1925 featuring the rounded wings from the steel bodies B10 combined with the fuel filler opening of the earlier cars. This model, along with a subsequent "Coupé De Ville," "Landaulet," and taxi version which featured the same combination, were listed as "Type B2" models while a number of the less mainstream body options were simply delisted. The far from simple cut-off between the B2 and the B10 means that confusion sometimes arises over which are which.

Although the "all-steel" bodied B10 could be seen as a replacement for the B2, the chassis and mechanical elements were for the most part interchangeable, and both models were produced in parallel during 1925 and 1926. However, in October 1925 Citroën unveiled another upgrade for their 10CV model, the Citroën B12, which by the end of 1926 had replaced both the B2 and the B10.

== Commercial ==
The all-steel bodied Citroën Type B10 unveiled in late 1924 effectively rewrote the rule-book for auto-making in Europe, even if the extent to which it had changed the economics of the business was not immediately apparent to most competitors. Nevertheless, the importance of the Type B10 sometimes tempts commentators who view history only backwards to overlook the Citroën Type B2.

For contemporary observers there could be no doubt about the significance of the Citroën Type B2, Europe's second mass-produced car, with 89,841 cars manufactured during a five-year period. The automobile business in France still contained a massively diverse range of companies in what had, till a few years before the outbreak of war, been the world's leading country for automobile production. But in 1925 there was no other manufacturer anywhere in Europe with anything approaching comparable production techniques or the B2's sales volumes with a single model.

== Delivery Van ==
The van models were called Boulangère or Normande for the B2 type and for the B14 type. The Boulangère was a box van and the Normande had a flatbed with a tarpaulin.

== Half-track variants ==
The Half-track cars that gained much media coverage by crossing the Sahara Desert in 1922 were based on the Citroën B2. André Citroën knew the value of publicity, and this was, unsurprisingly, the first crossing of the Sahara by this method.

Eight B2 based Half-track cars were also used for the celebrated (at the time) "Croisière noire" (Citroën central Africa expedition), crossing the continent from west to east at a wide point, via Lake Victoria, instigated by André Citroën and led by Georges-Marie Haardt and Louis Audoin-Dubreuil. The expedition took place between 28 October 1924 and 20 June 1925, and was the subject of much talk at the 19th Paris Motor Show in October 1924.

In 1924 Poland bought 135 complete chassis of the B2 with Kégresse track (known as Citroën-Kegresse B2 10CV). Some were converted to all-terrain lorries while 90 were converted to Samochód pancerny wz. 28 armoured cars.

== Classification in the French tax and insurance system ==
Like its predecessor, the car was a 10 CV.
