= A Automobile Company =

Defunct American motor vehicle manufacturer

The A Automobile Company was an American brass era automobile manufacturer located in Sacramento, California from 1910 to 1913. The company produced vehicles under the brand name Blue & Gold.

== History ==
Established in September 1910, the A Automobile Company was founded by San Francisco businessmen E. C. Collins (president), J. H. Graham (vice president), T. F. Cooke (treasurer), and C. E. Gibbs (secretary). They planned to construct a factory with a capacity of 5000 cars, on land provided by the North Sacramento Land Company.

Offices were set up in Sacramento in January 1911.

Their first product was to be a torpedo-bodied runabout, named the Blue & Gold.

By 1913, a small number of cars had been built, with four- or six-cylinder engine, electric lights, self-starting, and left-hand drive. The four-cylinder, on a 108 in (2,700 mm) wheelbase, was priced at US$1150, with sliding-gear three-speed transmission. The six-cylinder sold for $2100.

Though production in 1913 was projected to be 500, as few as 29 were actually built.
