= GJG =

Defunct American motor vehicle manufacturer

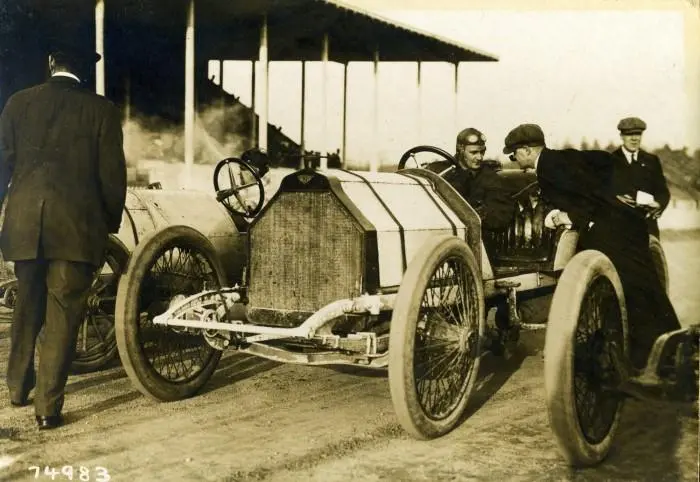
GJG Race car

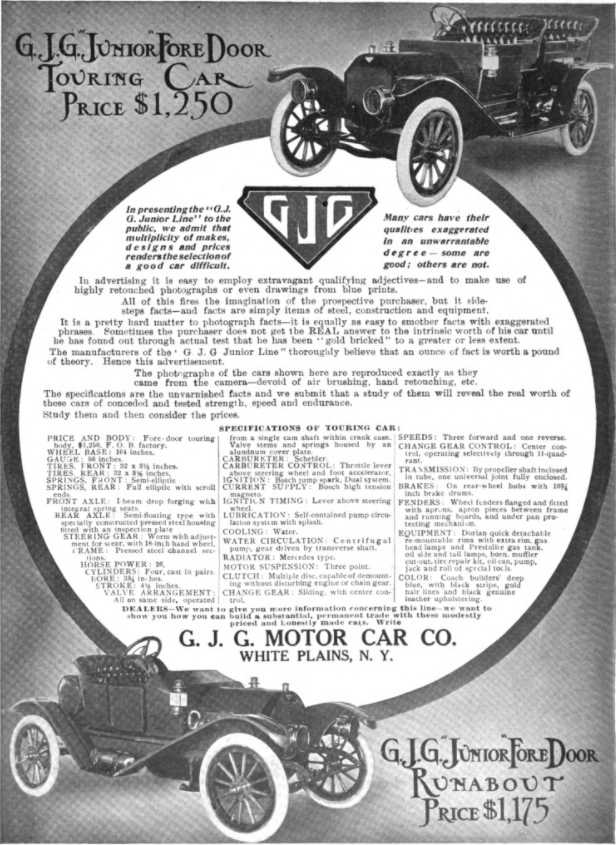
1911 GJG ad

The GJG was an American automobile manufactured from 1909 to 1914 by George John Grossman in White Plains, New York. It was assembled from imported components, which included a "Renault-type" 26 hp or 40 hp four-cylinder engine. The smaller-engined car was called the Junior, and the larger the Senior. The latter was available with either "Cruiser Torpedo", "Carryall" or "Pirate Runabout" bodywork.

Grossman closed the company in 1914 as he said it was no longer making money.
