= Citroën Type B12 =

Citroën Type B12 10CV
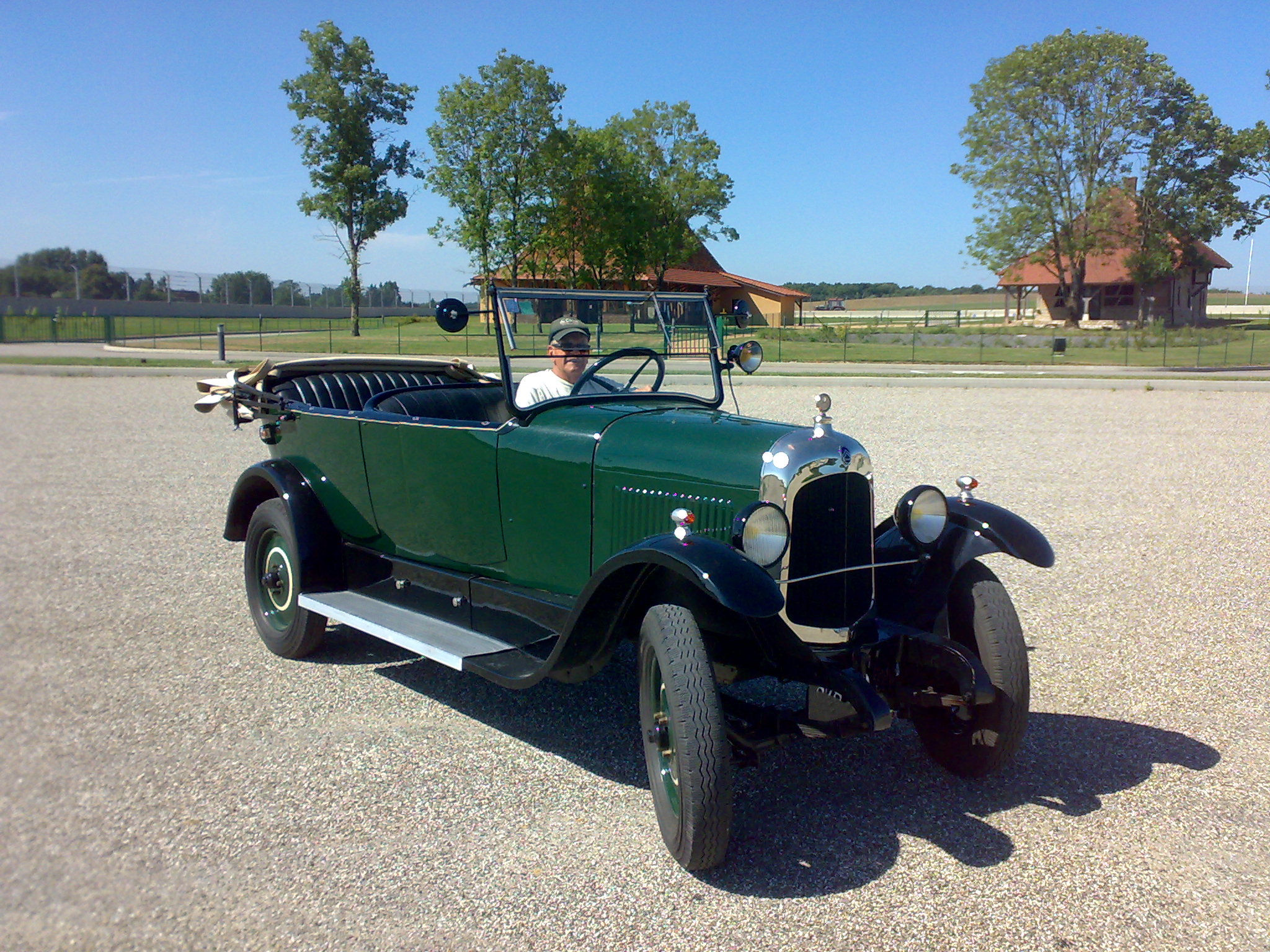
- Citroën B12 with "Torpedo" bodywork

Overview
- Manufacturer: Citroën
- Production: 1925–1927; 38,381 produced

Body and chassis
- Body style: "Torpedo" "Conduite Intérieure" (saloon/sedan); Cabriolet; Torpédo commercial Coupé de ville
- Layout: FR layout

Powertrain
- Engine: Petrol/gasoline: 1,452cc Straight-4
- Transmission: 3-speed manual

Dimensions
- Wheelbase: 2,830 millimetres (111.4 in)
- Length: 4,000 millimetres (157 in)

Chronology
- Predecessor: Citroën Type B10
- Successor: Citroën Type B14

The Citroën B12 is an automobile produced by Citroën at André Citroën's factory in central Paris, and available for public sale between October 1925 and January 1927. 38,381 were produced.

Major competitors included the Peugeot 177 and the Renault KZ.

The B12 was manufactured using modern mass production technologies which in France at the time, were still unique to Citroën. It also used "all-steel" ("tout-acier") bodies for its two most popular body types.

== Context ==
First displayed at the Paris Motor Show in October 1925, the Citroën B12 shared its chassis and engine with the B10, which it replaced.

== The car ==
The size of the 4-cylinder engine remained at 1,452 cc, and as with the earlier model, the B12 was sometimes known as the Citroën 10HP (or 10CV), the HP in the suffix being a reference to its fiscal horsepower, a number computed according to the cylinder diameters and used to define its taxation class.

A range of body types was listed, although most of the cars came with "Torpedo" type or "Conduite Intérieure" (two-box saloon/sedan) bodies. Other body types listed were a cabriolet, a "Torpédo commercial" and something called a "Normande".

== The "tout-acier" (all-steel) body ==
The B10 had been the manufacturer's (and Europe's) first production car comprising an all-steel body. Its replacement -- the B12 -- was the second. This approach garnered much positive reaction in an age that valued innovation, but the B10 itself had forced the manufacturer onto a very steep learning curve, which unfortunately had been shared by customers. The B10 had been insufficiently rigid. Once the car got moving, the body had twisted and flexed, causing sections of bodywork to become detached and doors to open spontaneously. The B10 had inherited its chassis from the B2, but it was quickly apparent that a stronger and stiffer chassis would be needed to complement the necessary rigidity of an all-steel car body.

The "Type B12" came with a newly reinforced chassis which addressed the rigidity issues, but the car was nevertheless significantly heavier. With the engine still offering the same 20 HP of horsepower as before, the manufacturer's listed top speed was now 70 km/h (44 mph) as against the 72 km/h (45 mph) claimed four years earlier for the "Type B2". (Actual top speed would no doubt have varied according to the body type specified, weather conditions, and the weight of the passengers and their luggage.)

The popular "Torpedo" type and "Conduite Intérieure" (two-box saloon/sedan) cars were the only ones featuring the much vaunted "all-steel" bodies in full. The others used a combination of old and new body structures, which removed the need to tool up dies for stamping out the relatively small numbers of panels needed for the less ubiquitous body types.

== Brakes and springs ==
Criticism of the B10's brakes was addressed with the "Type B12" which incorporated a new system of drum brakes that now worked on all four wheels. (On the earlier car the front wheels had been unbraked.) There was also a new semi-elliptical leaf spring arrangement at the front.

== Commercial ==
Like the "Type B10", the "Citroën Type B12" was in effect a one-year model. Partly because of the challenges with the new body making techniques, only 17,259 B10s had been manufactured. For the 1926 model year, the B12 more than doubled than figure, with 38,381 cars produced.

The successor model, the "Citroën Type B14", was formally released at the Paris Motor Show in October 1926 (although it would be 1927 before the last of the B12s found customers).

== Classification in the French tax and insurance system ==
The car, like its three predecessors, was a 10 HP (10 CV).

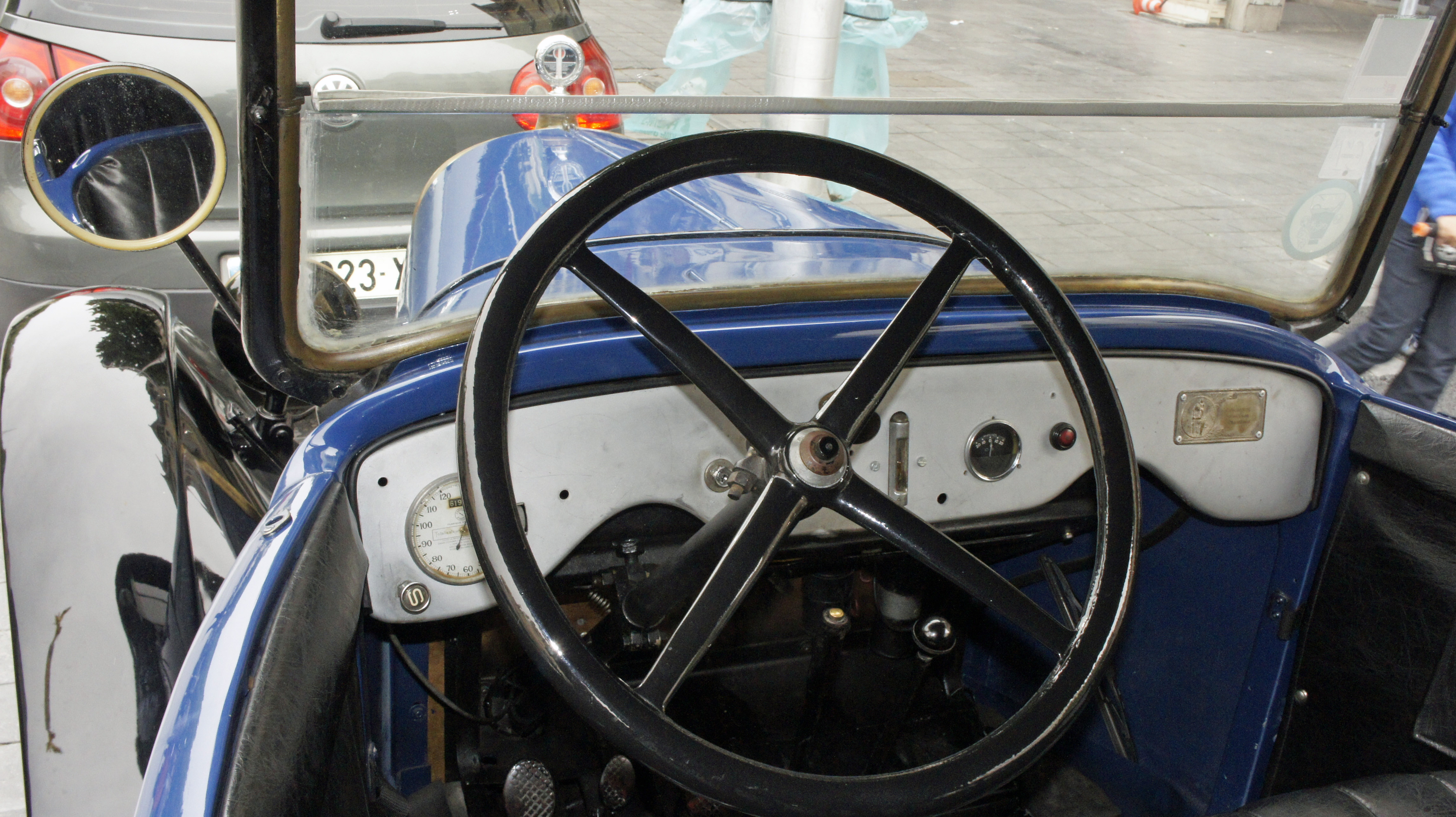
The dashboard.

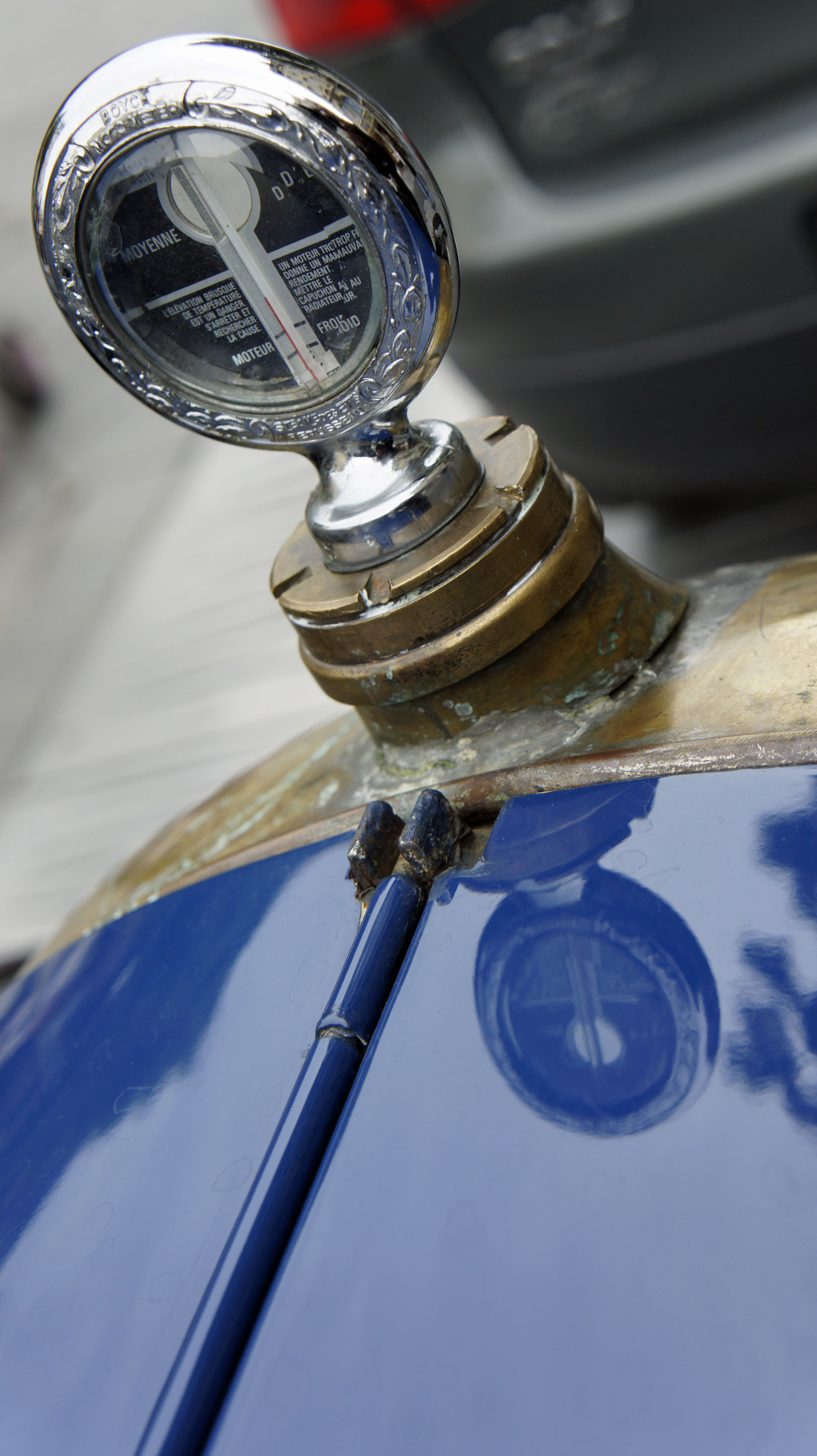
The radiator emblem.

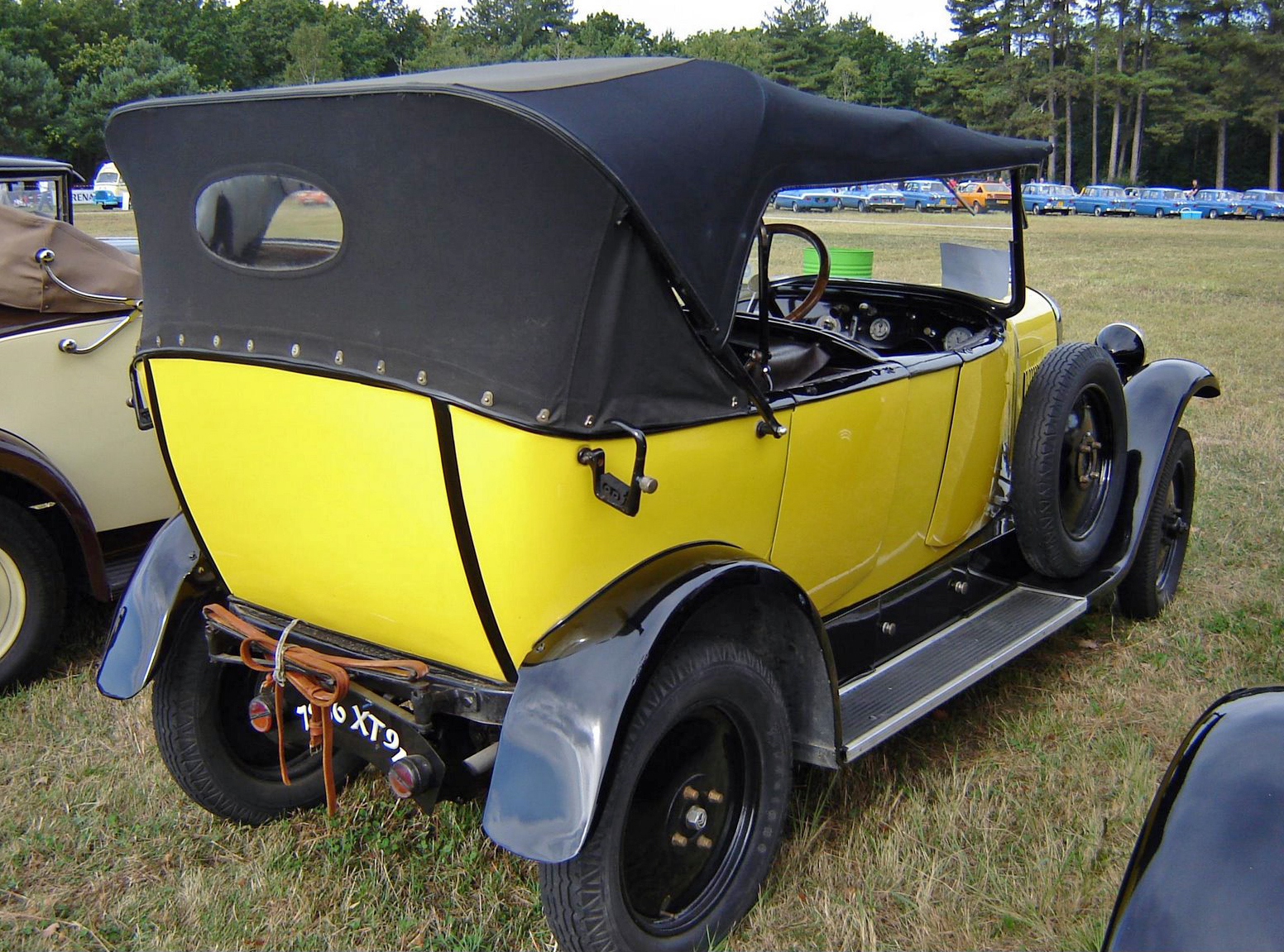
B12 "Torpedo".

== Bibliography ==
- Jacques Wolgensinger, André Citroën, Lupetti, ISBN 88-85838-69-3
- J.P. Foucault, Le 90 ans de Citroën, Éditions Michel Lafon, ISBN 978-2-7499-1088-8
- AA.VV., Citroën 1919-2006 - La storia e i modelli, Editoriale Domus
