= Citroën Type A =

Citroën Type A 10CV
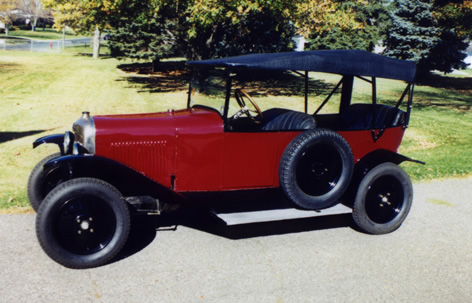

Overview
- Manufacturer: Citroën
- Production: 1919–1921; 24,093 made
- Assembly: Parc André Citroën, Quai de Javel, Vaugirard, Paris, France

Body and chassis
- Body style: "Torpedo" "Torpedo Sport" "Conduite Intérieure" (saloon/sedan) "Coupe de Ville"
- Layout: FR layout

Powertrain
- Engine: Petrol: 1.3 L Straight-4
- Transmission: 3-speed manual

Dimensions
- Wheelbase: 2.83 metres (111.4 in) (long); 2.55 metres (100.4 in) (short)
- Length: 4.00 metres (157.5 in) (long); 3.40 metres (133.9 in) (short)
- Width: 1.41 metres (55.5 in)
- Curb weight: 810 kg (1,790 lb) (long); 680 kg (1,500 lb) (short)

Chronology
- Predecessor: none
- Successor: Citroën Type B2

The Citroën Type A was produced from June 1919 to December 1921 in Paris, France. It was the first car Citroën made. 24,093 were built.

== Origins ==
During World War I, André Citroën was producing ammunition. As early as 1917, Citroën investigated the development of a light car of the medium range, under the direction of Jules Salomon.

== The car ==
Under the designation 10 HP Type A the car had a water-cooled 1327 cc four-cylinder engine and an output of 18 hp (13 kW). Its maximum speed was 65 km/h (40 mph). The chassis had inverted quarter elliptic springs at the front and double quarter elliptics at the rear. Braking was on the rear wheels only controlled by a hand lever with a foot pedal operated transmission brake.

The chassis was made in two lengths and could carry a variety of coachwork. The long chassis was available as Torpedo (four-seat tourer), Torpedo Sport, Conduite Intérieure, Coupé de ville and light truck and the short chassis with Torpedo (3-seat), Conduite Intérieure, Coupé de Ville and camionette (van). The shorter 2,550 mm (100.4 in) wheelbase chassis was available only on demand until the start of 1920 after which the option was withdrawn in order to maximize standardization and derive the resulting cost and efficiency benefits.

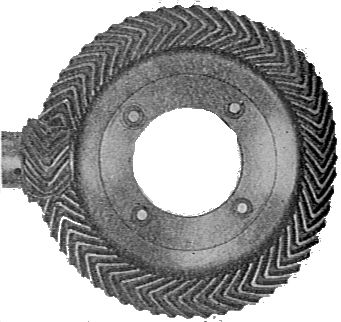
Final drive transmission of the Citroën Type A

The final drive used a bevel gear with herringbone teeth, whose shape was the inspiration for the Citroën double chevron logo.

== Commercial ==
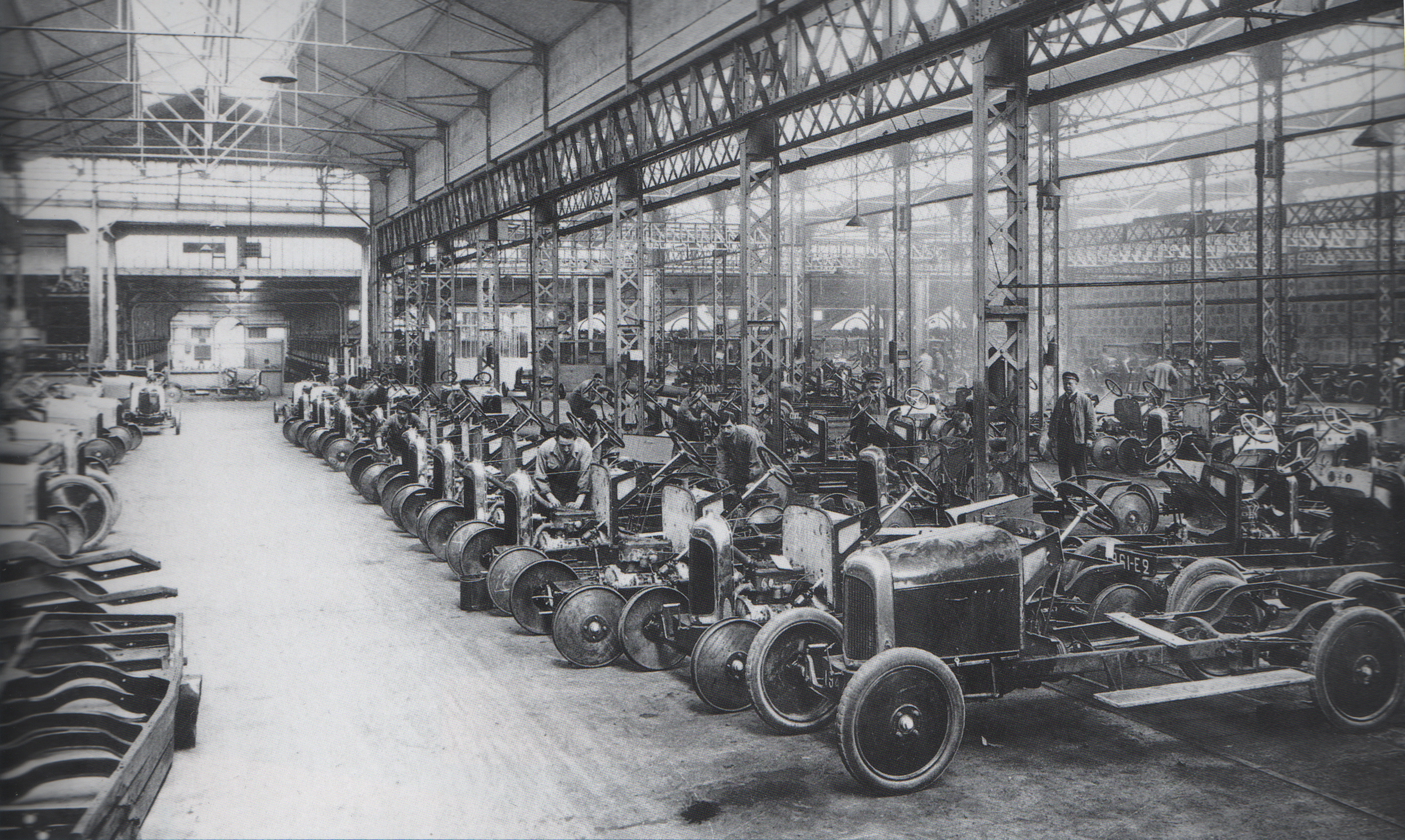
Production line for the Citroën Type A

In its first year of production, the standard Type A cost 7,950 francs. One year later the selling price had increased to 12,500 francs.

After a slightly hesitant start in 1919, sales took off in 1920, during which more than 20,000 cars emerged from the factory in a single year. With a production rate of 100 vehicles a day, Citroën became the first mass-production manufacturer in Europe.

Year	1919	1920	1921	Sum
	2,810	12,244	9,039	24,093

== Classification in the French tax and insurance system ==
The car was a 10 CV (fiscal power) and was advertised as such with the then more common English name "Horsepower" as 10 HP.
