= Benz 10/30 PS =

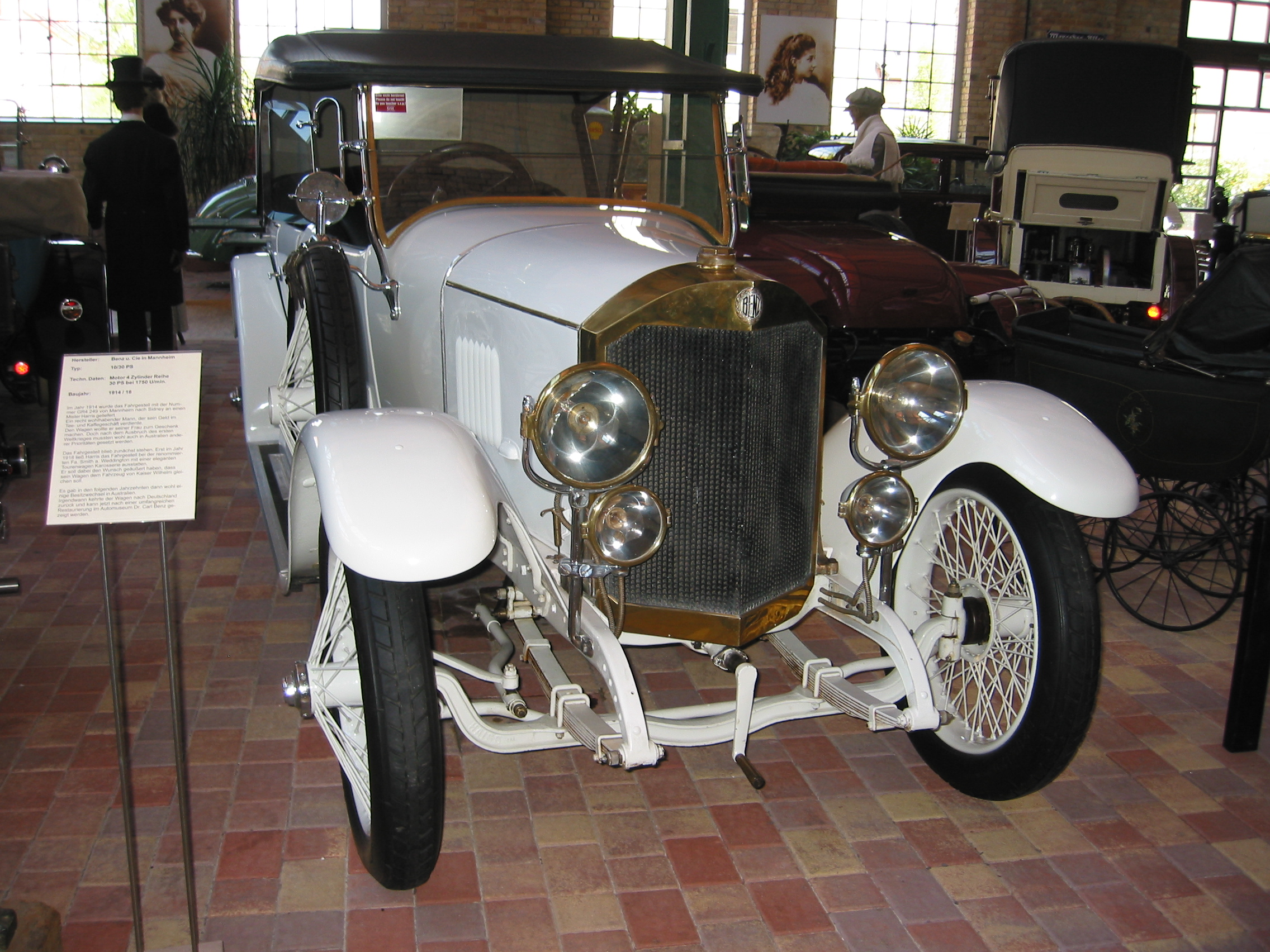
- Benz 10/30 PS with Torpedo style bodywork

Overview
- Manufacturer: Benz & Cie
- Also called: 1912-1927 Benz 10 PS; 1912: Benz 10/25 PS; 1912-26: Benz 10/30 PS; 1926-27 Benz 10/35 PS
- Production: 1912–1918; 1921–1927
- Assembly: Mannheim, Germany

Body and chassis
- Body style: Torpedo bodied “Tourenwagen” ”Limousine” (sedan/saloon); Many customers would have purchased the car in base chassis format and obtained a body separately
- Layout: FR layout

Powertrain
- Engine: 1912-27: 2,610cc Inline four-cylinder sidevalve engine

Dimensions
- Wheelbase: 3,125 mm (123.0 in)
- Length: 4,500 mm (180 in)
- Width: 1,700 mm (67 in)
- Height: 1,900 mm (75 in)

The Benz 10/25 PS was a midsize automobile introduced by Benz & Cie in 1912. The same year stated maximum output was increased which meant a name change to Benz 10/30 PS. The model disappeared for three years following the First World War but returned in 1921. A further power increase in 1926 meant another name change, now to Benz 10/35 PS. Following the "fusion" between the Daimler and Benz companies, production of the Benz 10/35 PS ended in 1927.

== Naming conventions ==
The manufacturer applied the widely followed German naming conventions of the time. On the Benz 10/30 PS the “10” defined the car's tax horsepower, used by the authorities to determine the level of annual car tax to be imposed on car owners. The “30” defined the manufacturer's claims regarding car's actual power output as defined in metric horsepower. In Germany tax horsepower, which had been defined by statute since 1906, was based on the dimensions of the cylinders in the engine. Unlike the systems used elsewhere in Europe, the German tax horsepower calculation took account both of the cylinder bore and of the cylinder stroke, and there was therefore a direct linear relationship between engine size and tax horsepower.

Although the car would have been promoted in its time as the 10/25 PS, the 10/30 PS or the 10/35 PS according to its actual power output at the time, in retrospect it is often known simply as the Benz 10 PS in order to avoid having to explain name changes during the model's production period.

== The car ==
The car presented in 1912 was powered by a four-cylinder "in-line" engine of 2,610 cc delivering a maximum of 25 PS (18 kW; 25 hp) at 1,600 rpm. Power passed through a leather cone clutch (“Lederkonuskupplung“) via a four-speed transmission and steel propeller shaft to the rear wheels. Top speed was given as approximately 70 km/h (45 mph).

In the same year the manufacturer announced a more powerful engine, unchanged in size, but now providing 30 PS (22 kW; 30 hp) of power at 1,750 rpm. Unusually at this time the four cylinders were in a single block formed from a single casting, rather than being set in a pair of two twin-cylinder blocks. The mechanically controlled brakes operated on the drive shaft until 1925 when the braking system was reconfigured and the brakes operated on all four wheels.

The bodies normally offered were for a Torpedo bodied “Tourenwagen” or a ”Limousine” (sedan/saloon). In parallel with the standard length chassis the manufacturer also offered a “Sport Runabout”, its wheelbase being reduced in length by 100 mm (3.9 in). The wooden-spoked wheels were attached to rigid axles suspended with simple leaf springs. Towards the end, some of the cars were produced with steel-spoked wheels.

== Impact of War ==
During the First World War the 10/30 PS continued to be produced but in reduced numbers. Demand during this time was stronger for the Benz 14/30 PS which produced the same advertised level of maximum power as the 10/30 PS but from a larger 3,560 cc engine. Despite the power levels being the same, the military believed that the larger-engined car was likely to be more robust. In the chaotic situation that hit Germany after the war, production of the 10/30 PS came to an end in 1918, but this turned out to be a temporary cessation and the manufacturer resumed production of the 10/35 PS in 1921. Unfortunately precise records covering this period were lost in the Second World War.

== 1920s upgrades ==
Benz sales literature from 1921 shows a return of the 10/30 PS with a water-cooled engine the same size as before, but thermosyphon cooling had now replaced the earlier pump based cooling system. Claimed maximum output remained at 30 PS (22 kW; 30 hp) but this was now achieved at the higher engine speed of 2,000 rpm. The position of the gear lever moved in 1923 from the outside of the car on the right side to what would subsequently become a more conventional position in the middle of the floor. (The driver of a Benz 10/30 PS sat on the right side of the car, which at this time was still virtually universal in Europe.)

From 1925 the brakes were rearranged, now operating on all four wheels rather than directly on the drive shaft.

In 1926 claimed maximum power from the 2,610 cc engine was increased to at 35 PS (26 kW; 35 hp) which necessarily triggered a name change, cars from this period being sold as the Benz 10/35 PS. By now a top speed of 80 km/h (50 mph) was being quoted.

== The end ==
Benz & Cie became financially badly overextended in the mid-1920s following the involvement of stock market speculator Jacob Schapiro who at one stage held 60% of the company's share capital. Most of Schapiro's share holdings ended up in the hands of Deutsche Bank, and it was determined that it would be necessary to merge the Benz business with Daimler of Stuttgart which for reasons of its own was itself in a delicate condition financially. Some sort of a merger between the two businesses had been under discussion at least since 1919 and an agreement between them was signed in 1924 and came into force in the middle of 1926. Future models would be developed by the merged Daimler-Benz AG business and the product development activities of the merged company were initially headed up by Ferdinand Porsche who came from the Daimler side of the business. The Benz 10/35 PS continued in production until 1927. By this time the Mercedes-Benz W 02, effectively the replacement for the Benz 10/35 PS, had been launched (at the Berlin Motor Show in October 1926) and was in production.

== Sources and further reading ==
- Werner Oswald: Mercedes-Benz Personenwagen 1886–1986. 4. Auflage. Motorbuch Verlag Stuttgart (1987). ISBN 3-613-01133-6, S. 46–47
- Halwart Schrader: Deutsche Autos 1885–1920. Motorbuch Verlag Stuttgart (2002). ISBN 3-613-02211-7, S. 67
- Oswald, Werner (2001). Deutsche Autos 1920-1945, Band (vol) 2 (in German). Motorbuch Verlag. ISBN 3-613-02170-6.

This entry incorporates information from the equivalent German Wikipedia entry.
