= Citroën Belphégor =

Citroën 350–850 N and P series (Belphégor)
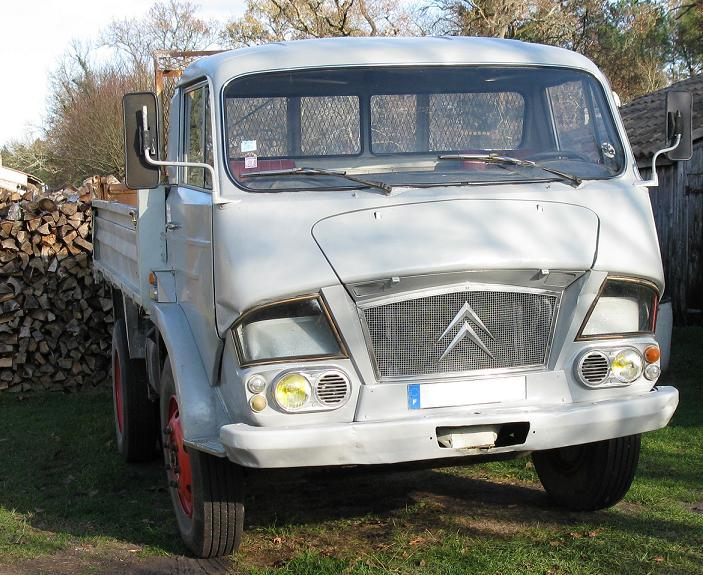
- 1966 Citroën PD 600

Overview
- Manufacturer: Citroën
- Also called: Belphégor
- Production: 1965–1974

Body and chassis
- Class: Heavy utility vehicle Medium-duty truck

Powertrain
- Engine: Inline 4 and 6-cylinder petrol and diesel engines Displacement: 2176 to 5607 cc Power output: 82–108 DIN hp
- Transmission: 4- or 5-speed manual

Dimensions
- Kerb weight: 5,990–12,400 kg (13,206–27,337 lb) (GVWR); 18,950 kg (41,778 lb) (GCWR)

Chronology
- Predecessor: Citroën Type 55
- Successor: Berliet Citroën Dauphin K

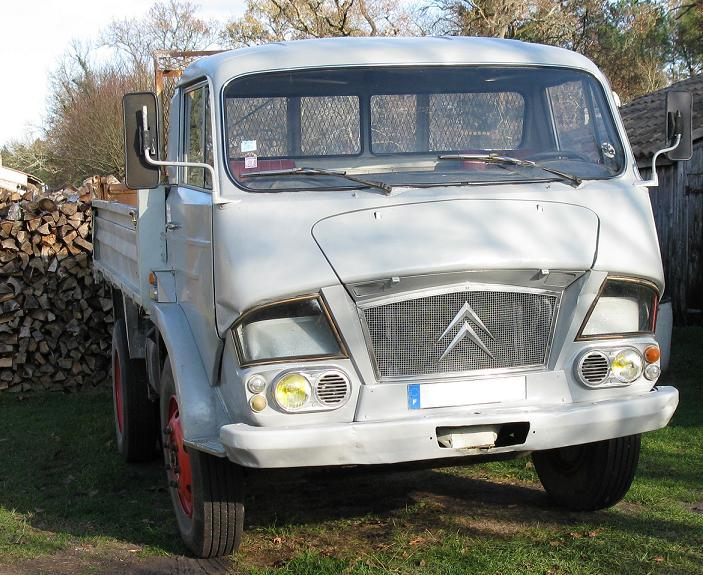
1966 Citroën Belphégor 600

In 1964, Citroën released a range of trucks from 3.5 to 8 ton capacity, styled by Flaminio Bertoni, the Italian sculptor also responsible for the Citroën 2CV, DS, Ami 6, and Traction Avant cars. In production until 1974, the medium-duty truck was intended as the replacement for the older Citroën U23 trucks. The U23, however, was kept in production alongside its replacement until 1969, as they were still profitable in spite of their age.

Although they were named 350 to 850 (N or P models), the trucks' unusual appearance meant they were known as the "Belphégor", after the then-popular television series about a mystery in the Louvre Museum, Belphégor. The number signified the load capacity in tens of kilogrammes. There were diesel and petrol four-cylinder engines (350–480), as well as diesel and petrol six-cylinder ones (600–850) in the heavier-duty models.
