= Citroën U23 =

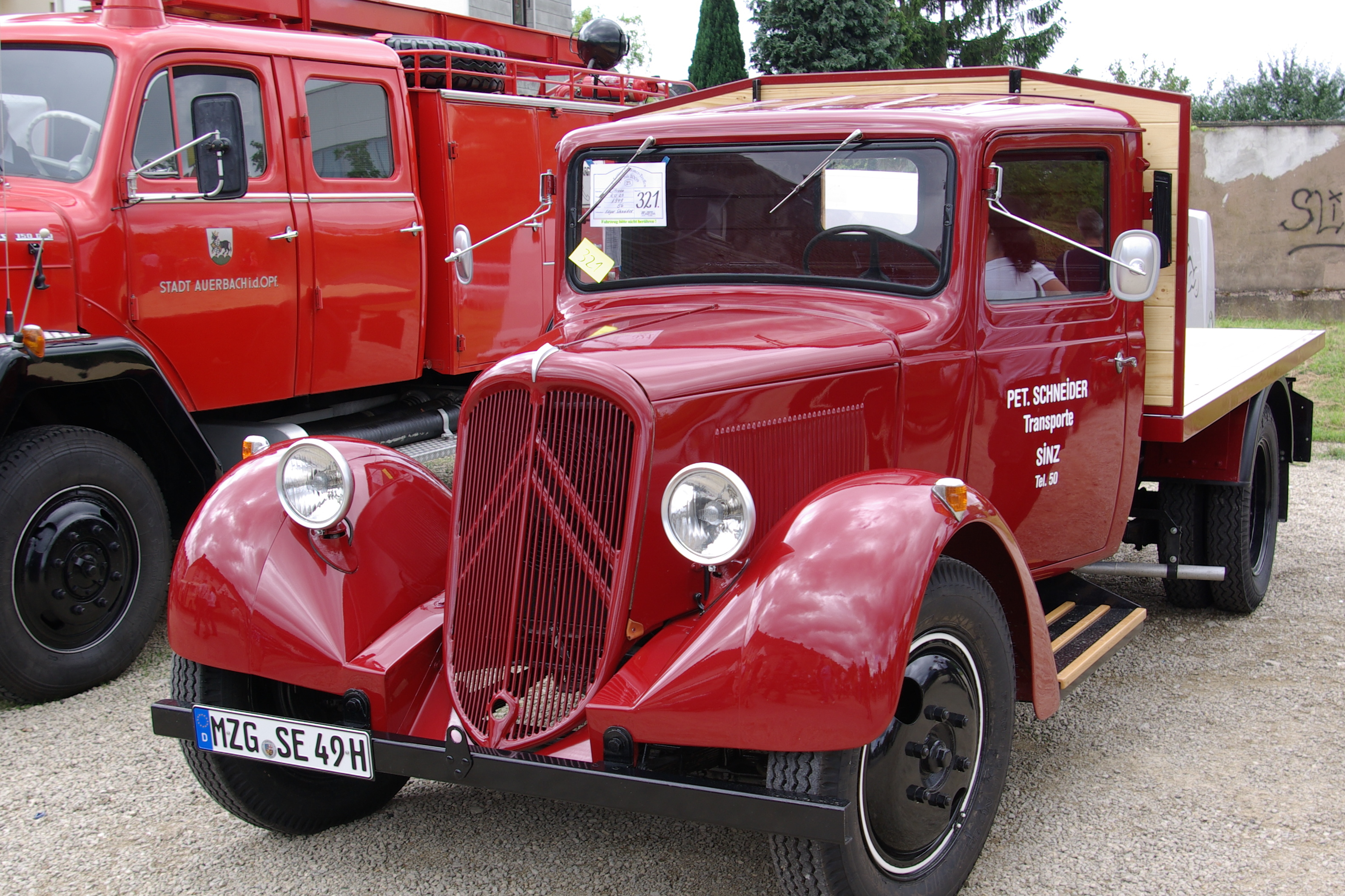
- Citroën U23 (1949)

Overview
- Manufacturer: Citroën
- Also called: Citroën Type 23
- Production: 1935–1969
- Designer: Flaminio Bertoni

Powertrain
- Engine: 1,911 cc (116.6 cu in) I4 (petrol); 1,767 cc (107.8 cu in) I4 (diesel)
- Transmission: 4-speed manual

Dimensions
- Wheelbase: 3,380 mm (130 in) (1935–1940); 3,750 mm (150 in) (1940–1969)
- Length: 5,080 mm (200 in) (1935–1940); 5,580 mm (220 in) (1940–1969)
- Width: 1,960 mm (80 in)

Chronology
- Successor: Citroën 350 to 850

The Citroën U23, also called Citroën Type 23, was a light (2-ton) truck introduced by Citroën in 1935. Although the engine cowling and front body appeared similar to the Citroën Traction Avant's, the U23 had a conventional rear-wheel-drive layout. Production lasted through 1969, and approximately one million were produced.

The truck was powered by a 1911 cc four-cylinder petrol engine, with a 1767 cc four-cylinder diesel engine made available in 1936.

One major customer was the French military, who ordered large quantities of Type 23s after the declaration of World War II. At the time of the German invasion, more than 12,000 had been delivered in less than ten months. About 6,000 were pressed into German service after the French defeat of June 1940.

Bus and coach versions, called the Type 23 RU, were introduced in 1941.

The U23 underwent a major restyling in the mid-1950s, giving it a wide horizontal grille that incorporated the headlamps, which were previously mounted to the fenders. It was gradually replaced by the Citroën 350 to 850 range, also called Belphégor, which had been introduced in 1964, although U23 production continued until 1969.

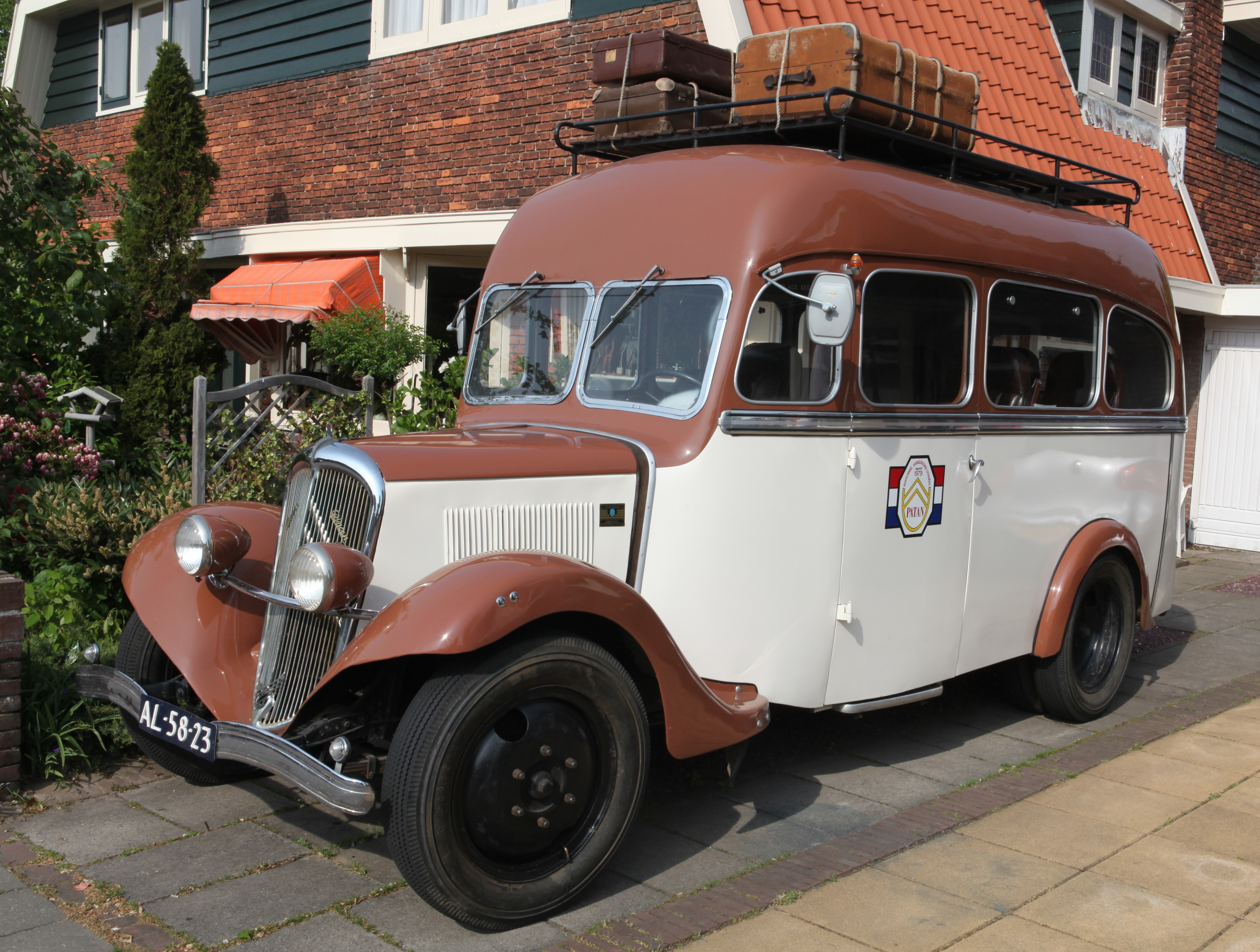
Type 23 RU

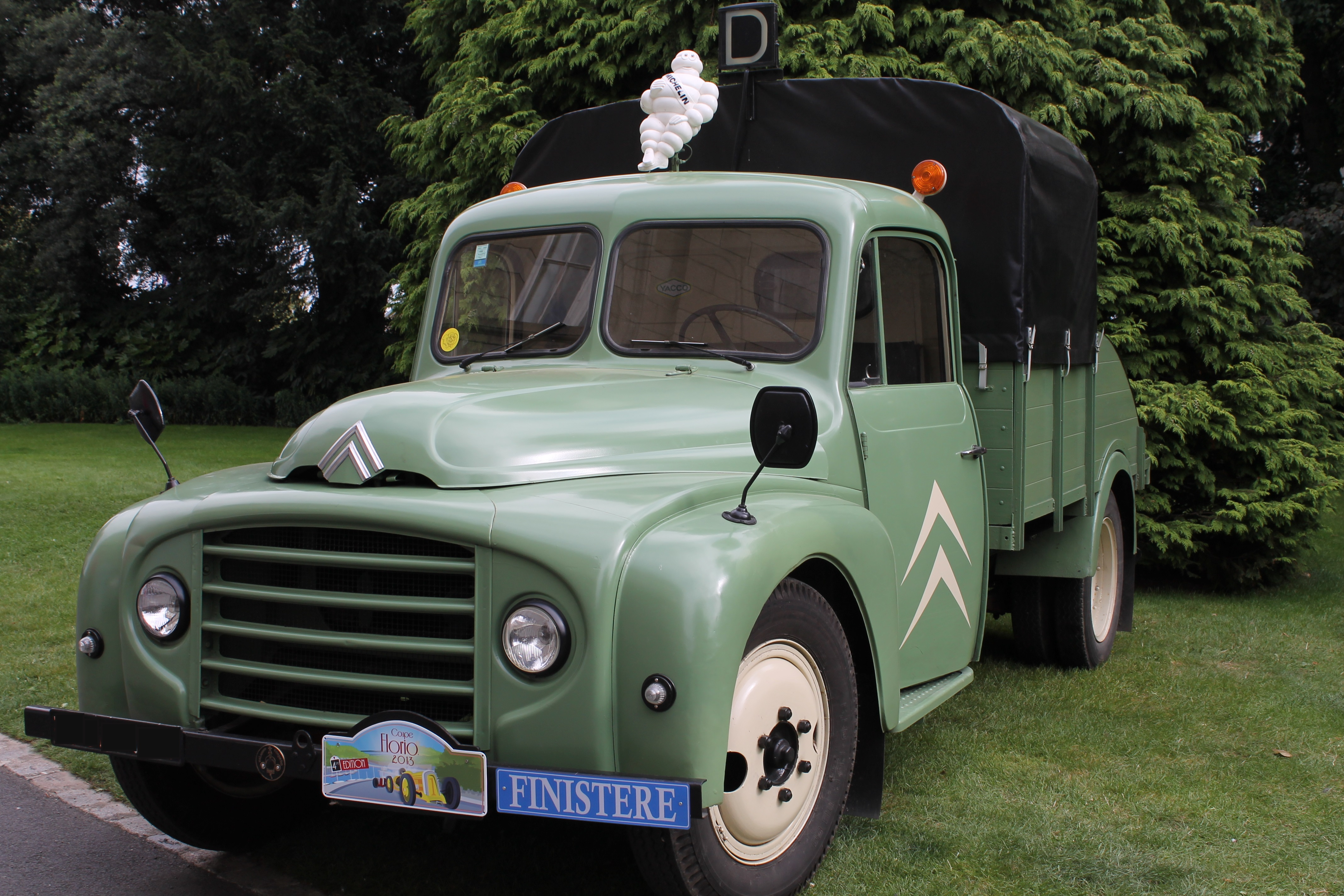
Facelifted Type 23
