= André Citroën =

French industrialist and Citroën car brand founder

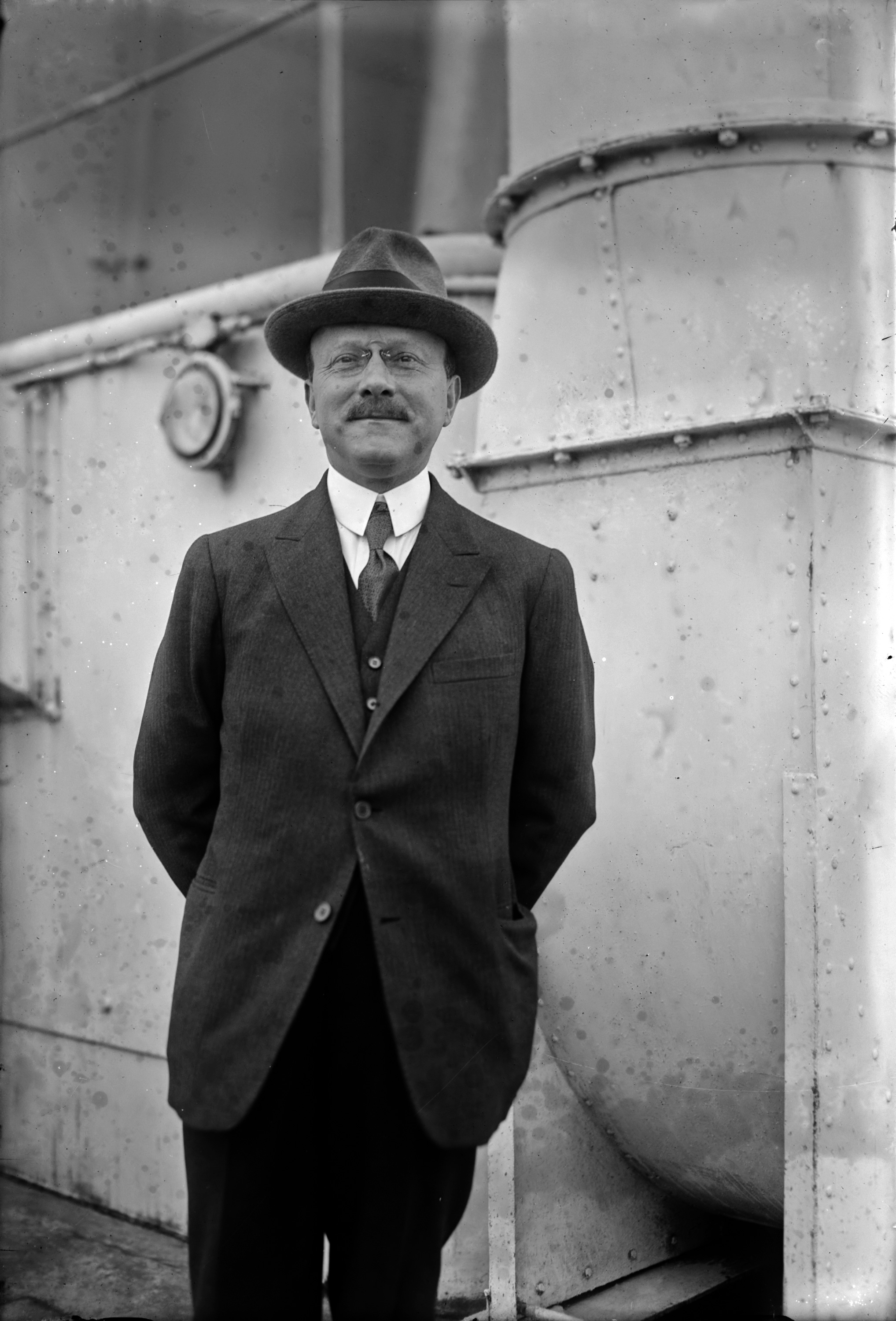
- Citroën on an ocean voyage
- Born: André-Gustave Citroën; 5 February 1878; Paris, France
- Died: 3 July 1935 (aged 57); Paris, France
- Resting place: Montparnasse Cemetery, Paris, France
- Occupations: Businessman, engineer
- Known for: Founder of Citroën
- Relatives: Alfred Lindon (brother-in-law)

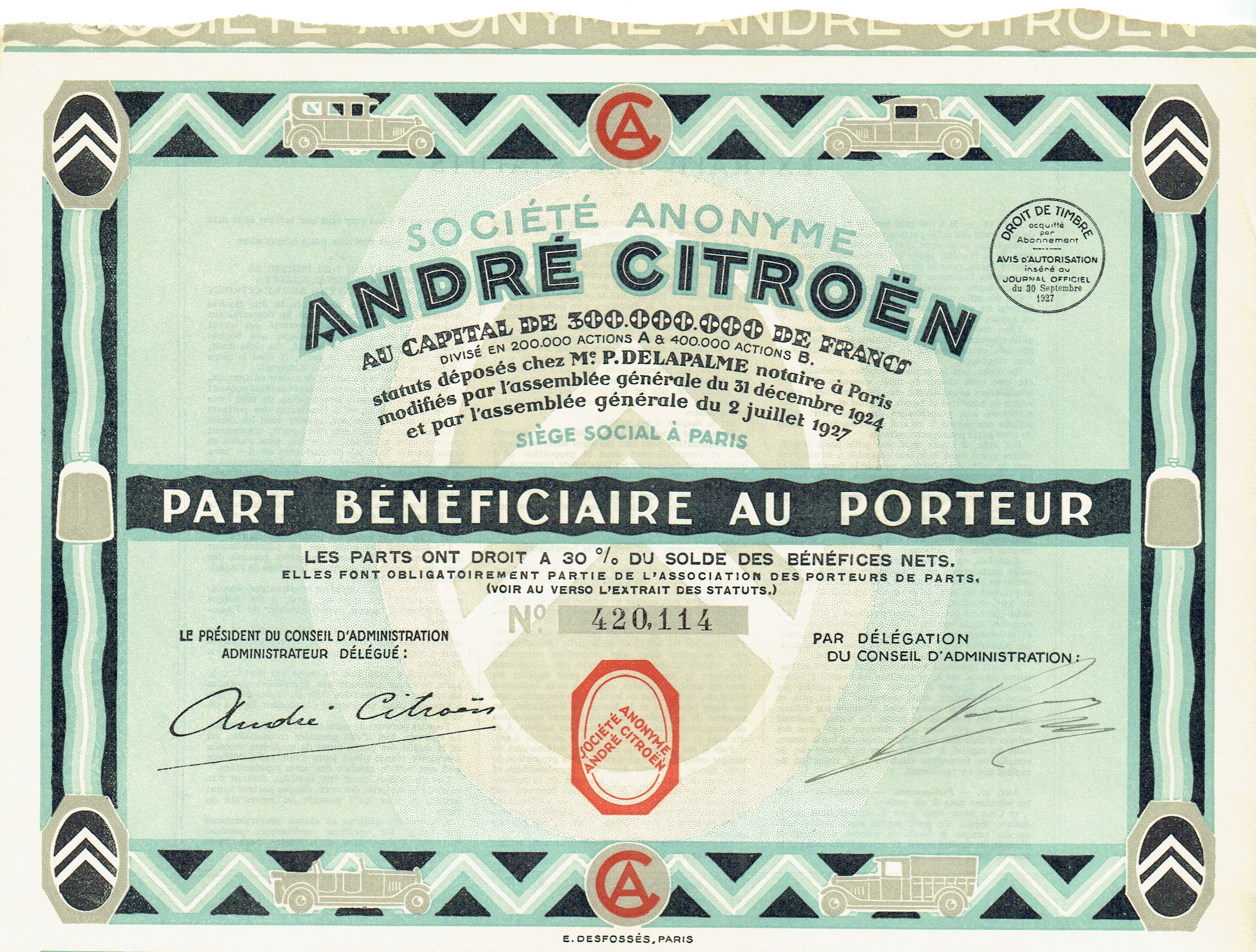
Certificate of the S. A. André Citroën, issued 30 September 1927, signed by André Citroën

André-Gustave Citroën (French: [ɑ̃dʁe ɡystav sitʁɔɛn]; 5 February 1878 – 3 July 1935) was a French industrialist and founder of major automaker Citroën. He is also remembered for his application of double helical or herringbone gears.

== Life and career ==
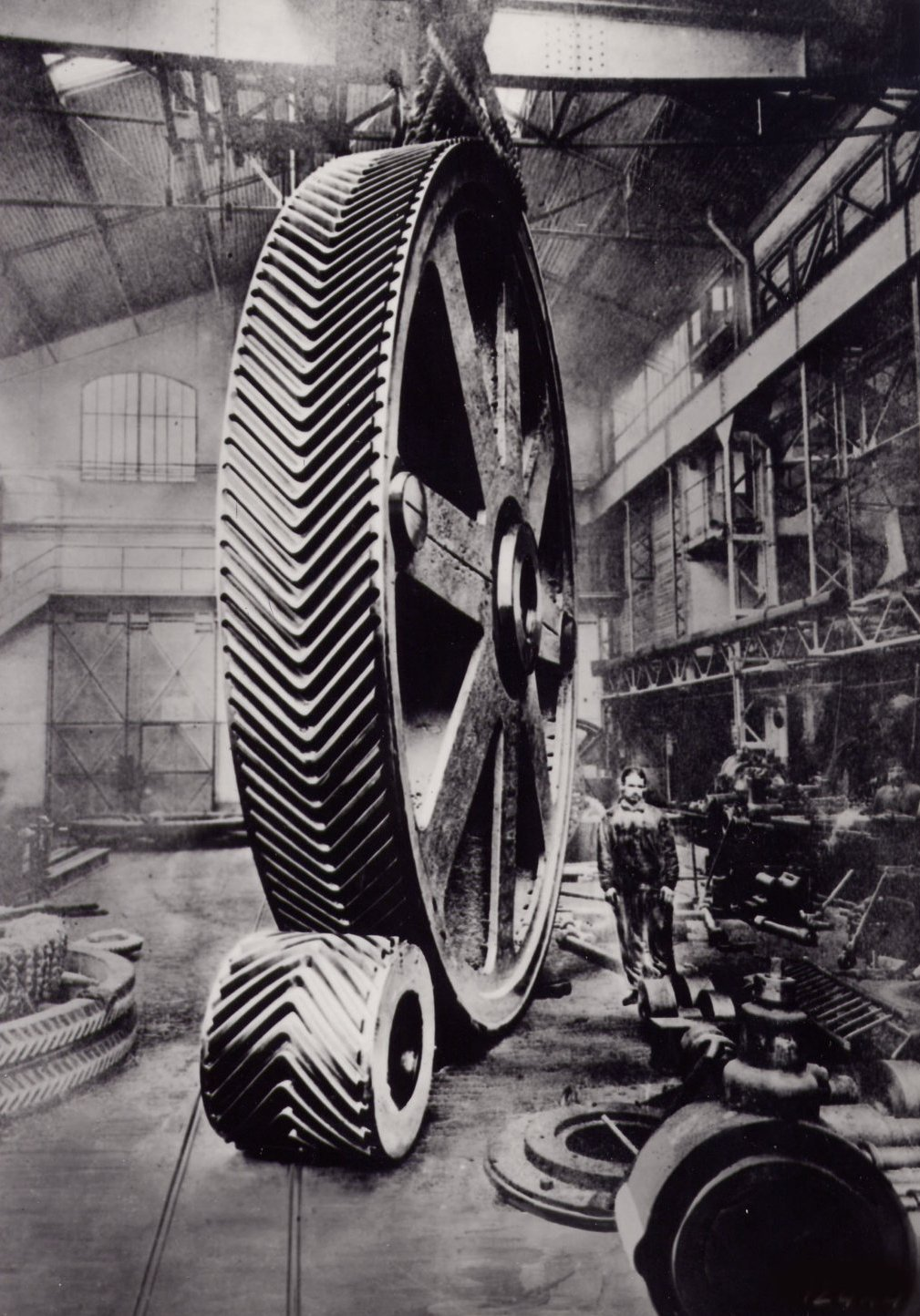
The herringbone gears that formed the basis of the Citroën logo

Born in Paris in 1878, André-Gustave Citroen was the fifth and last child of his Jewish parents, diamond merchant Levie Citroen and Masza Amelia Kleinman. He was a cousin of the British philosopher Sir A. J. Ayer, the only son of his aunt Reine.

The Citroen family descended from a grandfather in the Netherlands who had been a greengrocer and seller of tropical fruit, and had taken the surname of Limoenman, Dutch for "lime man"; his son however changed it to Citroen (pronounced [siˈtrun]), which in Dutch means "lemon". In 1873 the family moved to Paris; upon arrival, the French tréma was added to the surname (reputedly by one of André's teachers), changing Citroen to Citroën.

His father died by suicide when André was six years old, presumably after failure in a business venture in a diamond mine in South Africa. It is reputed that the young Citroën was inspired by the works of Jules Verne and had seen the construction of the Eiffel Tower for the World Exhibition, making him want to become an engineer. He graduated from the École Polytechnique in 1899.

During a trip to Poland, the birthplace of his mother who had recently died, around 1900, Citroën saw a local carpenter working on a set of gears with a distinctive fishbone structure. Finding them less noisy and more efficient, Citroën bought the patent for cheap and perfected it. The gears' pattern was reputed to inspire the double-chevron marque of the Citroën brand. In 1908, he was appointed a manager of the automotive company Mors.

During World War I, Citroën gained an international reputation for mass-producing armaments during the war. His activities were extensive in connection with the Renault plant, which employed 35,000 men in munitions manufacturing. After the war, he became a director for the Société Française Doble, but abandoned it to establish his eponymous automobile company in 1919.

Citroën became the fourth-largest automobile manufacturer in the world in the 1930s, peaking in 1932, with the revolutionary Traction Avant at its spearhead. However, cost struggles aggravated by the Great Depression made it bankrupt in 1934. The firm was taken over by its main creditor and tire provider Michelin. After initial problems, sales of the Traction Avant improved again, leading it to persevere through World War II until 1957.

André Citroën died of stomach cancer in Paris in 1935. His funeral at the Montparnasse Cemetery was led by the Chief Rabbi of Paris.

== Posthumous recognition ==
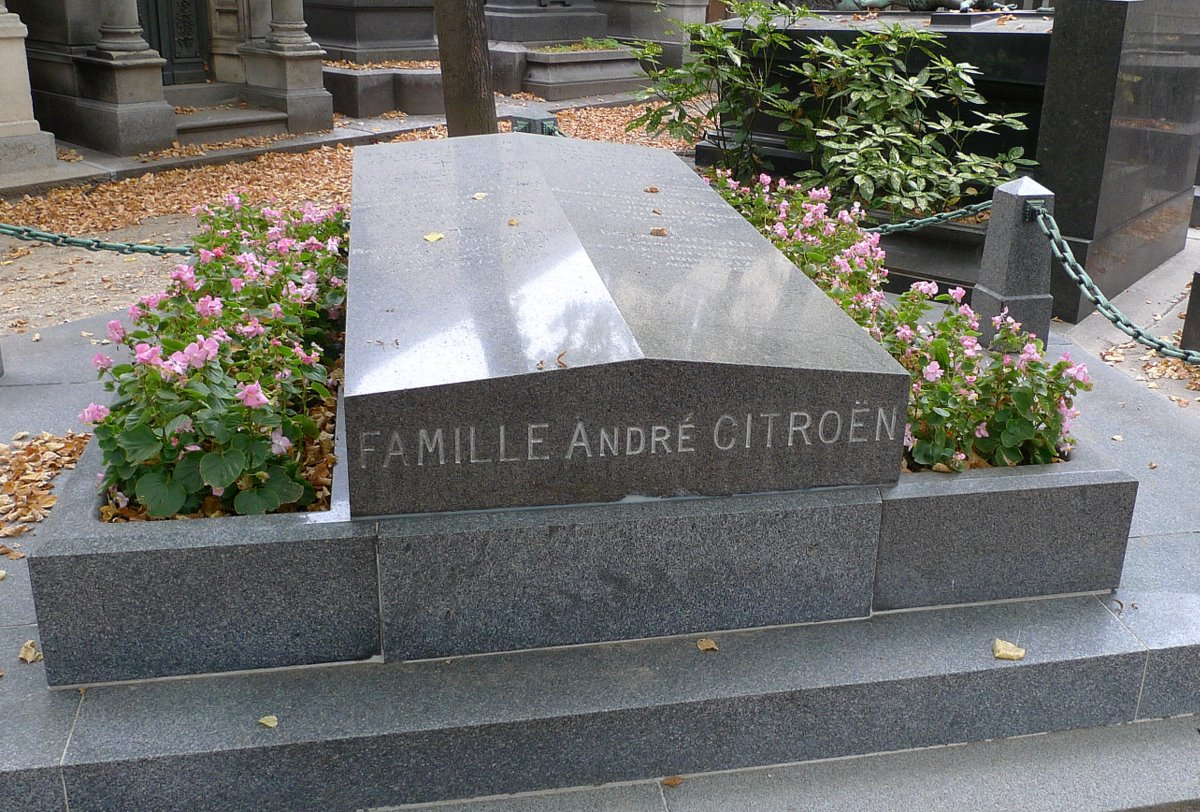
André Citroën's grave in Paris

On 9 October 1958, while the Paris Motor Show was running, the city fathers renamed the Quai de Javel as the "Quai André Citroën" in recognition of the transformation effected since the city's 15th arrondissement, two generations earlier characterized by market gardening, had been selected by Citroën as the location for Europe's first mass production car plant.

This was the second celebrity name for the street which in 1843 had been baptised "Quai de Javel," in recognition of the chemical factory that had been set up to produce a range of industrial acids, and which later numbered the well known eponymous "Eau de Javel" (bleach) among its products.

In 1992, the Parc André Citroën public garden in Paris was named after him. It was built on the site of the former automobile manufacturing plant of Citroën, which operated until its closure in the 1970s, and which had been demolished during an eight-year period, between 1976 and 1984. In 1998, André-Citroën was inducted into the Automotive Hall of Fame in Dearborn, Michigan.

== See also ==
- Arthur Constantin Krebs, Panhard General Manager from 1897 to 1916

== Bibliography ==
- Reynolds, John (1997). Andre Citroen: The Man and the Motor Cars. Basingstoke: Palgrave Macmillan. ISBN 978-031-216-505-5.
- Broustail, Joël (2020). Citroën et le citroënisme : essai historique sur la passion automobile et l'innovation [Citroën and Citroenism: Essay on the History of Automobile and Innovation] (in French). Paris: Au Pont 9. ISBN 9791096310609.
