= Quai André Citroën =

Thoroughfare in Paris, France

Coordinates: 48°50′39″N 2°16′31″E

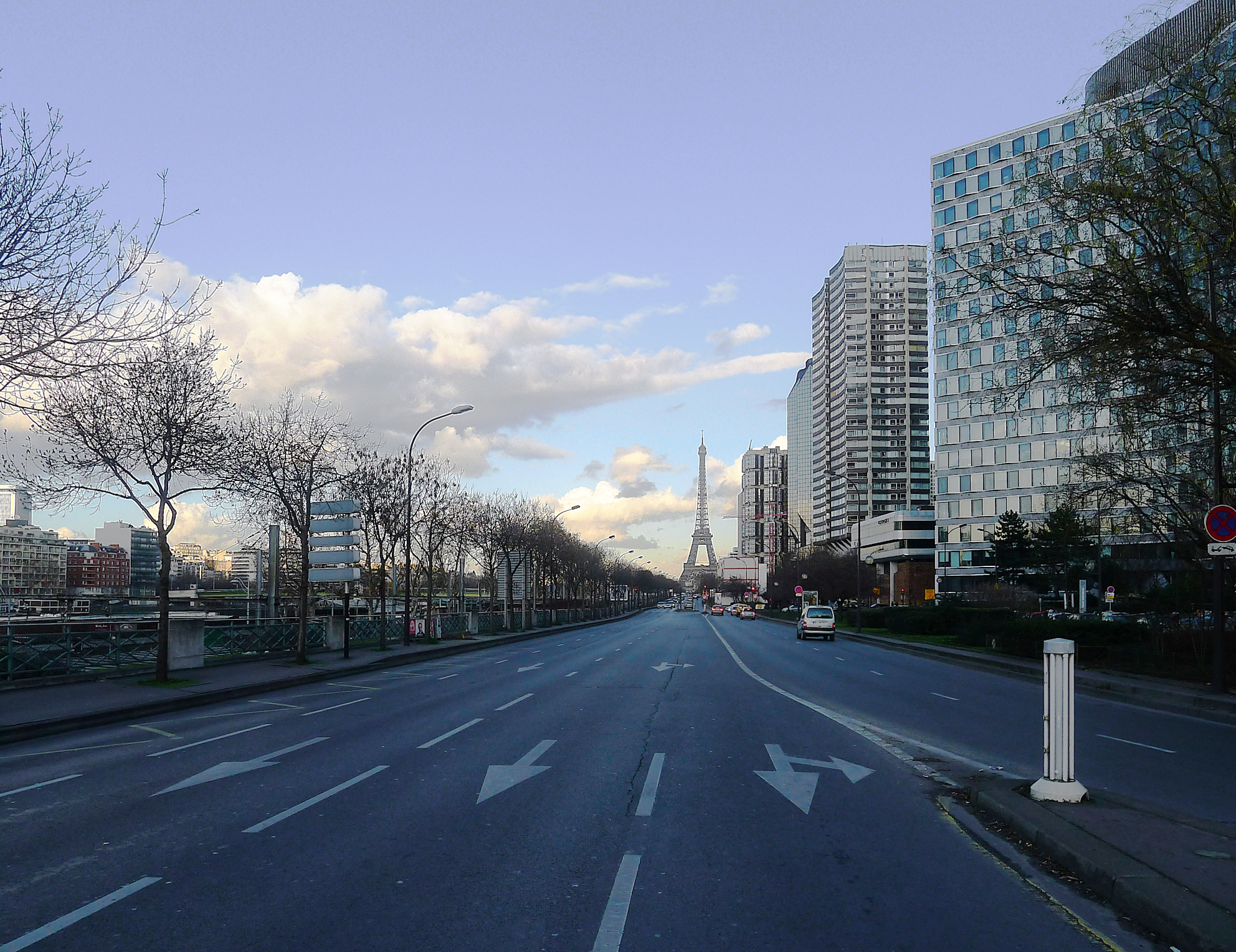
Quai André Citroën

The Quai André Citroën is a road and quay along the rive gauche of the Seine, in the 15th arrondissement of Paris. Formerly the Quai de Javel, after the town of Javel formerly on the site (this developed in 1485 out of the village of Javetz and its small port and boat yard), it was renamed in honour of the car manufacturer André Citroën (1878–1935).

The Citroën factories operated there between 1915 and 1974 (on what is now the Parc André Citroën).

The quay's axis is largely north-east to south-west. It continues in the north into the Quai de Grenelle at the Pont de Grenelle, and to the south by the Quai d'Issy-les-Moulineaux at the Pont du Garigliano. The Pont Mirabeau also joins to the Quai André-Citroën. The whole of this quay along the Seine is occupied by the Port de Javel.

== Notable sites ==
- Front de Seine, a collection of 1970s skyscrapers
- Parc André Citroën
- The headquarters of France Télévision, on the extreme south end of the quay.
