= Parc André-Citroën =

Urban park in Paris, France

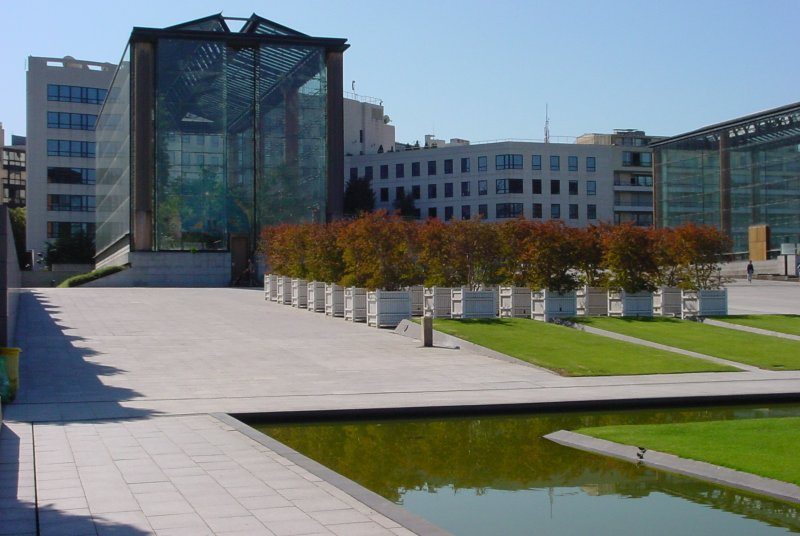
- Greenhouse in Parc André-Citroën
- Interactive map of Parc André-Citroën
- Type: Urban park
- Location: 15th arrondissement, Paris
- Coordinates: 48°50′28″N 2°16′29″E
- Area: 34.6 acres (14.0 ha)
- Created: 1988
- Status: Open all year
- Public transit: Located near the Métro stations Balard and Lourmel

Parc André-Citroën is a 14 hectares (35 acres) public park located on the left bank of the river Seine in the 15th arrondissement of Paris.

Built on the site of a former Citroën automobile manufacturing plant, the park is named after company founder André Citroën. When it opened in 1992, it was the largest park to open in Paris in more than a century.

== History ==
In 1915, Citroën built its factory on the banks of the Seine where it operated until the 1970s. At that time, 24 hectares (59 acres) were vacated and subsequently addressed in Paris' urban plan, ultimately giving rise to the Parc André Citroën. The park was designed beginning of the 1990s by the French landscape designers Gilles Clément and Alain Provost and the architects Patrick Berger, Jean-François Jodry and Jean-Paul Viguier.

== Design ==
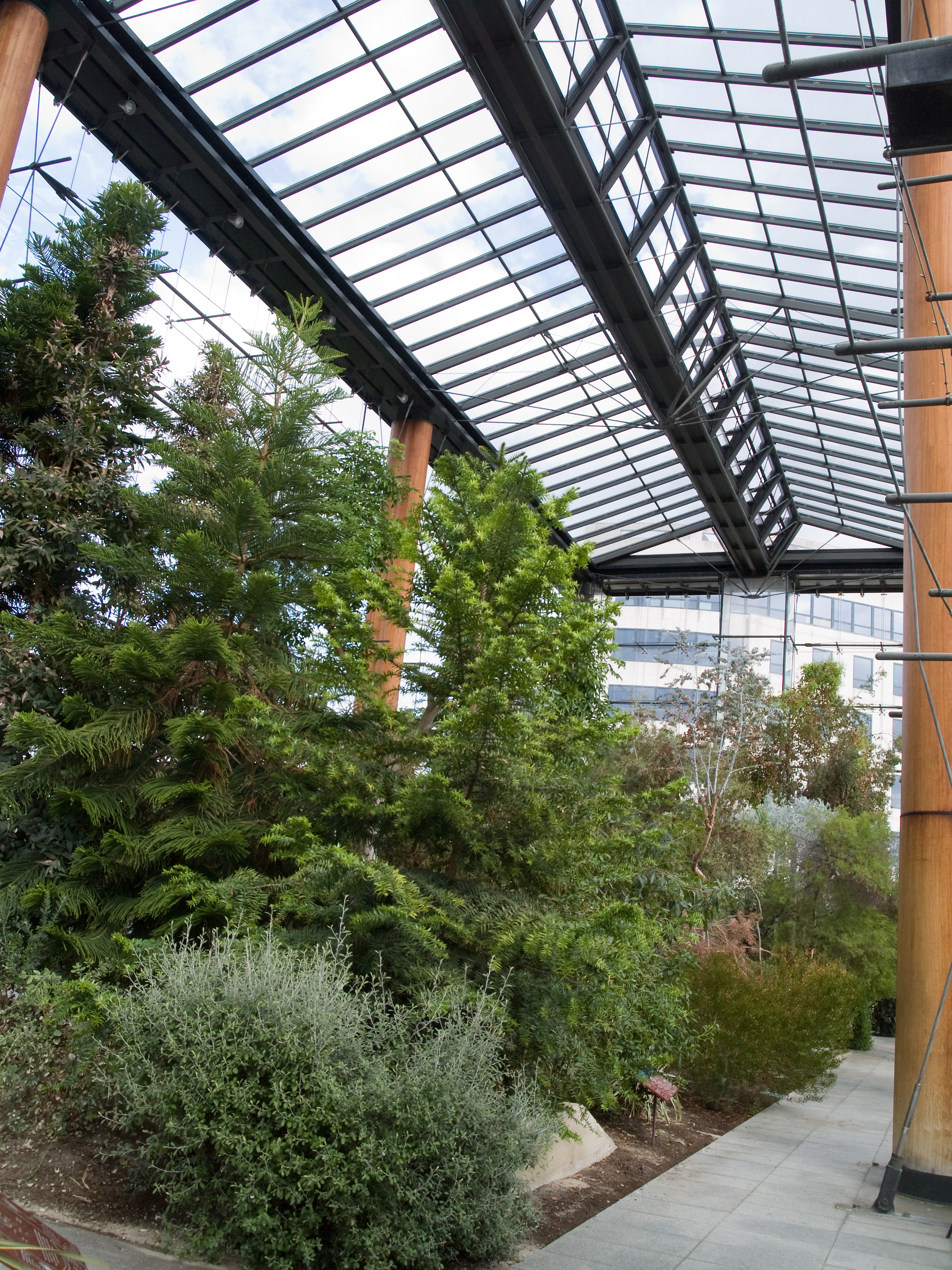
Inside one of the two greenhouses

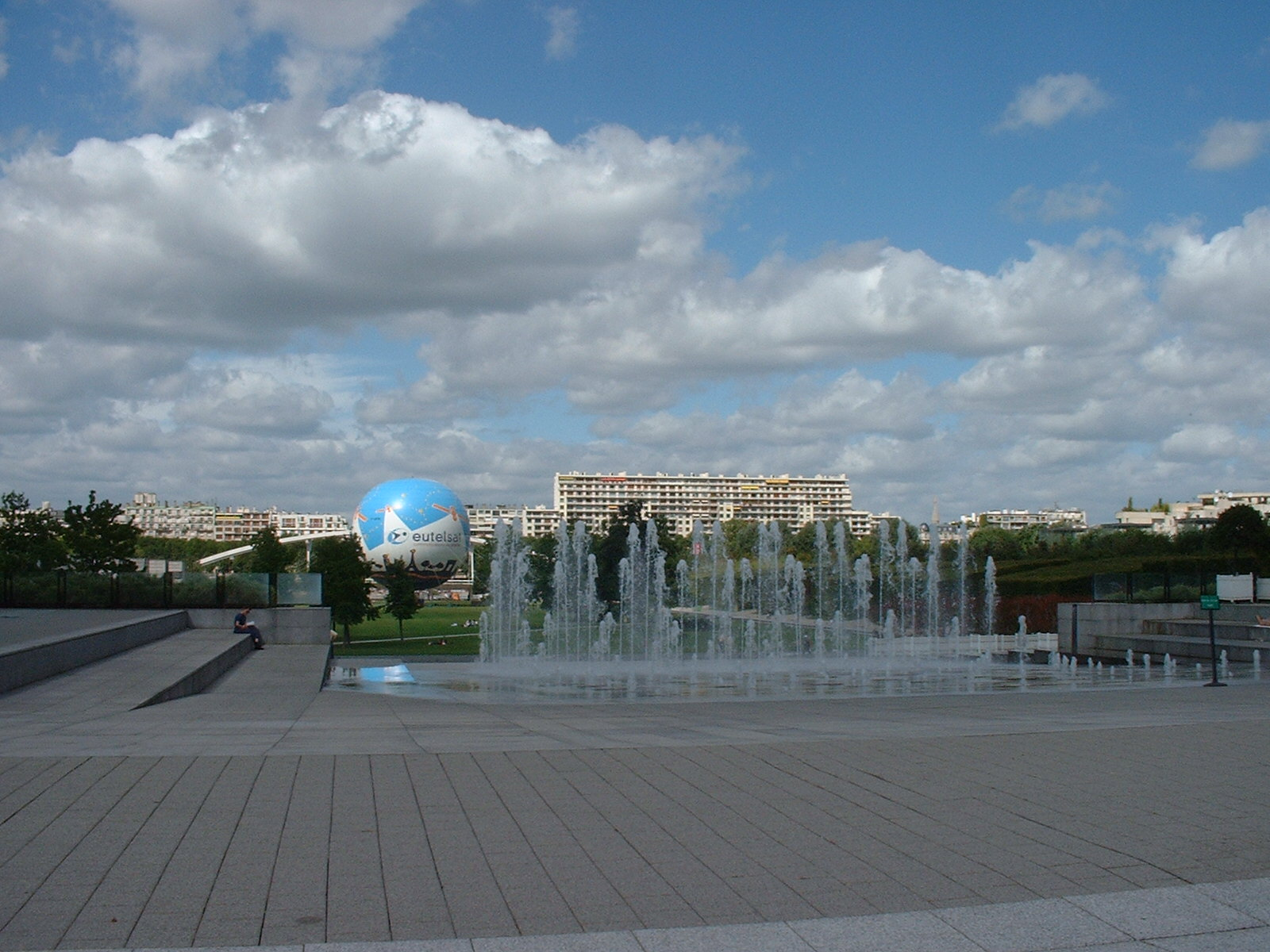
Fountains and the Paris Balloon

The park is built around a central, rectangular lawn of roughly 273 by 85 metres (895' x 279') in size. It is embellished with two greenhouse pavilions (hosting exotic plants and Mediterranean vegetation) at the eastern, urban end which are separated by a paved area featuring dancing fountains. The south edge of the lawn is bounded by a monumental canal — the "Jardin des Métamorphoses" — composed of an elevated reflecting pool that reaches through granite guard houses, lined by a suspended walkway. On the north side are two sets of small gardens: the six "Serial Gardens", each with a distinct landscape and architectural design and a "Garden in Movement" that presents wild grasses selected to respond at different rates to wind velocity. A 630-meter (690 yard) diagonal path cuts through the park.

Since 1999, the park has hosted the Paris Balloon (Ballon Generali), a tethered helium balloon which under optimal weather conditions can lift a maximum of 30 visitors 300 meters (1000') above Paris. The ten-minute ride provides views of the Champ de Mars, the River Seine, Basilica of the Sacré Cœur and the Notre Dame de Paris Cathedral.

The six serial gardens are each associated with a metal, a planet, a day of the week, a state of the water and a sense:

- The blue garden: copper, Venus, Friday, rain, and the sense of smell,
- The green garden: tin, Jupiter, Thursday, spring water, and the sense of hearing.
- The orange garden: mercury (the metal), Mercury (the planet), Wednesday, creeks, and the sense of touch.
- The red garden: iron, Mars, Tuesday, waterfalls, and the sense of taste.
- The silver garden: silver, the Moon, Monday, rivers, and sight.
- The golden garden: gold, the Sun, Sunday, evaporation, and the 6th sense.

The white garden and black garden (of 1 and 2 hectares; 2½ and 5 acres respectively) are detached from the main 11-hectare (27 acre) section of the park.

Plan of the Parc André-Citroën

== See also ==
- History of Parks and Gardens of Paris
