= Torpedo (car) =

Vintage automobile body style

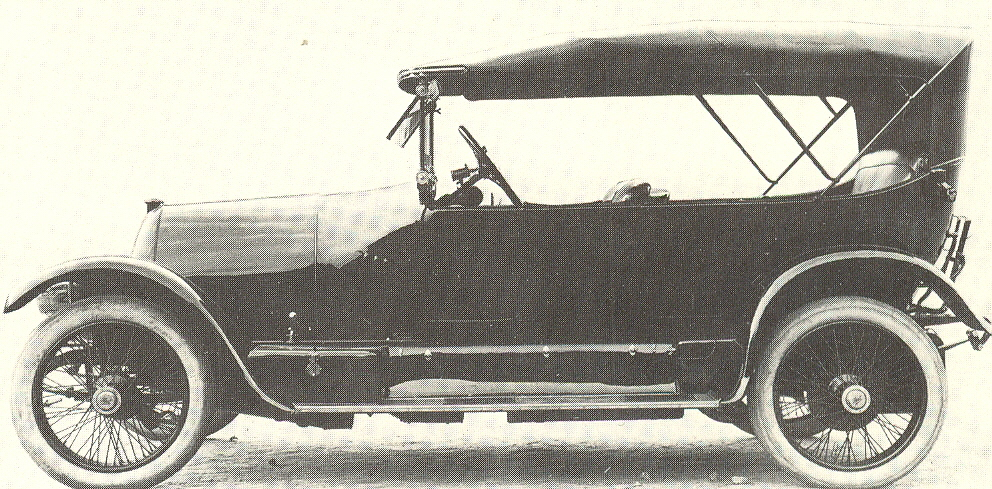
1912 Fiat Type 3 torpedo

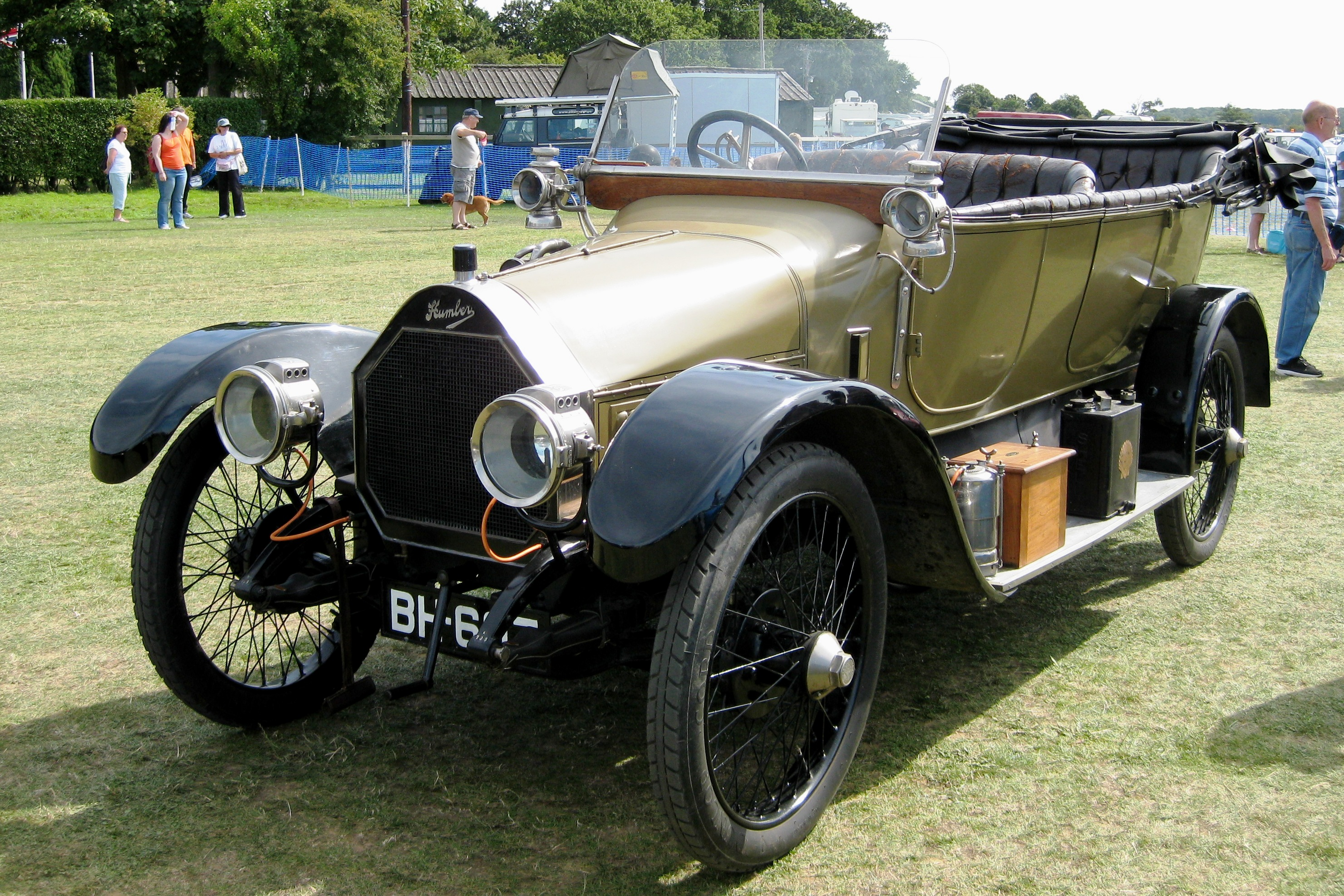
1914 Humber 11 torpedo

The torpedo body style was a type of automobile body used from 1908 until the mid-1930s, which had a streamlined profile and a folding or detachable soft top. This design included a hood or bonnet line that was raised to align with the car's waistline, creating a straight beltline from front to back.

The name was introduced in 1908 when Captain Theo Masui, the London-based importer of French Gregoire cars, designed a streamlined body and called it "The Torpedo".

The Torpedo body style was usually fitted to four- or five-seat touring cars (cars without a fixed roof) with detachable or folding roof, and low side panels and doors. Torpedo cars did not have B pillars, so the only uprights present were those supporting the windshield.

Similar styles are phaeton and baquet.

The name is also used for trucks with a hood or bonnet.
