= Aid station =

Temporary facility to provide immediate medical care

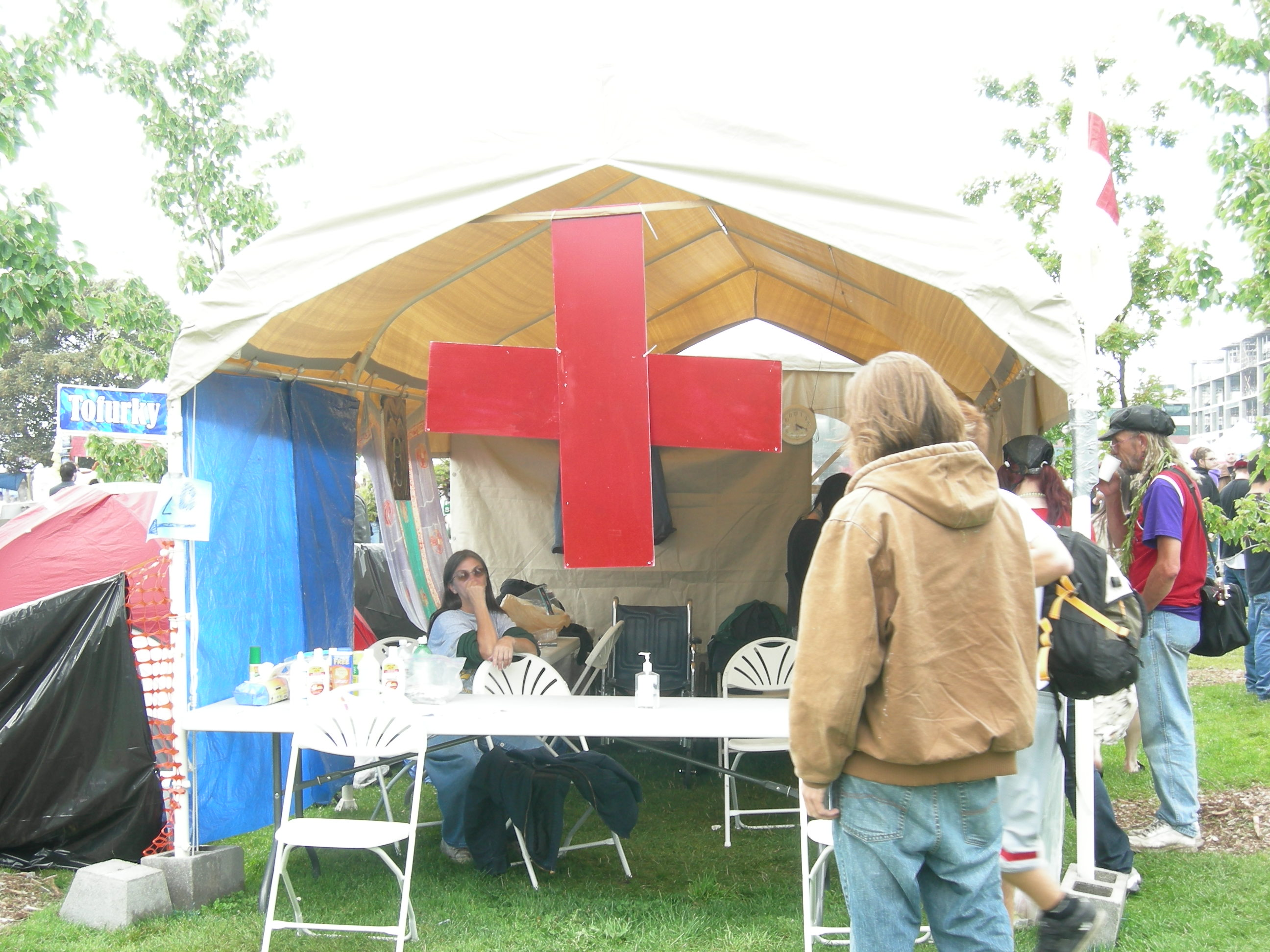
An aid station at a public festival

An aid station is a temporary facility (often a tent, table, or general rest area) established to provide supplies to endurance event participants or medical first aid and provisions during major events, disaster response situations, or military operations.

Aid stations may be divided into sections where the station serves both medical and non-medical functions.

== Sporting events ==
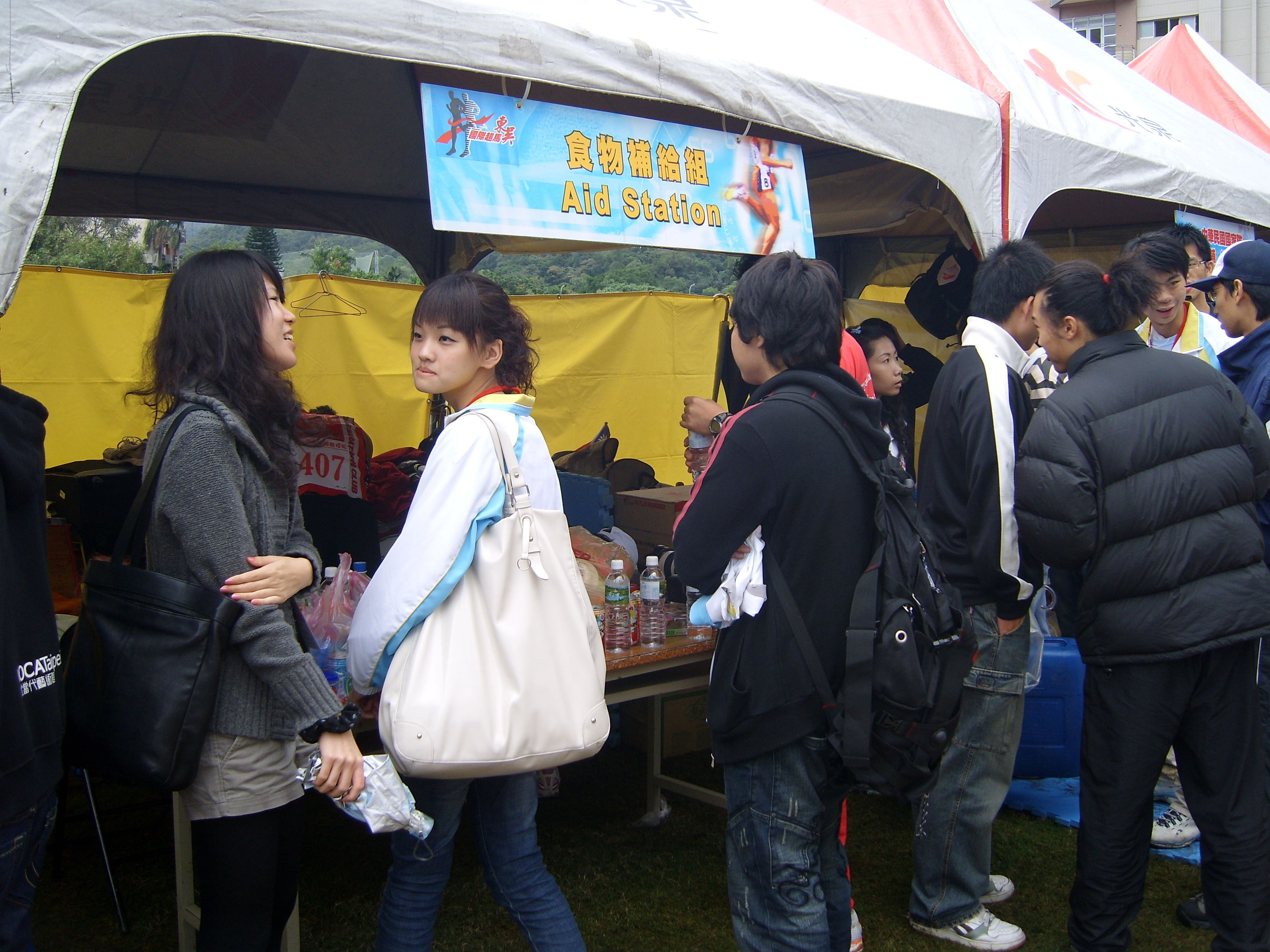
An aid station at the 2007 Soochow 24-hour ultramarathon

At endurance races like marathons or bicycle racing events, aid stations are established along the race route to provide supplies (food, water, and repair equipment) to participants. During modern cycle races, aid station functions may be performed by a mobile SAG Wagon ("supplies and gear") or support vehicle that travels with participants at the rear of the peloton.

Typically sports drinks and energy gels are provided as well as water. Depending on the length of the race, food may be available. Often, medical supplies will also be available.

The aid station may also serve as a checkpoint to track competitors. During events where the distance between aid stations is predetermined and known by competitors, some trainers advise using aid stations as course markers for pace-setting. Aid stations can also have cutoff times, a deadline by which runners must depart the aid station to still be considered in the race. These cutoff times are to ensure participant safety, and to better manage course closures and volunteer shifts.

At some major annual marathon events, particular aid stations and their operators have become local institutions. The Chicago Marathon, for example, has annual prizes for aid stations and aid station volunteers and some volunteers have managed the same station each year for many years. The event includes very large stations, some with more than 300 volunteers, and event organisers publish an Aid Station Instruction Book.

== Military operations ==
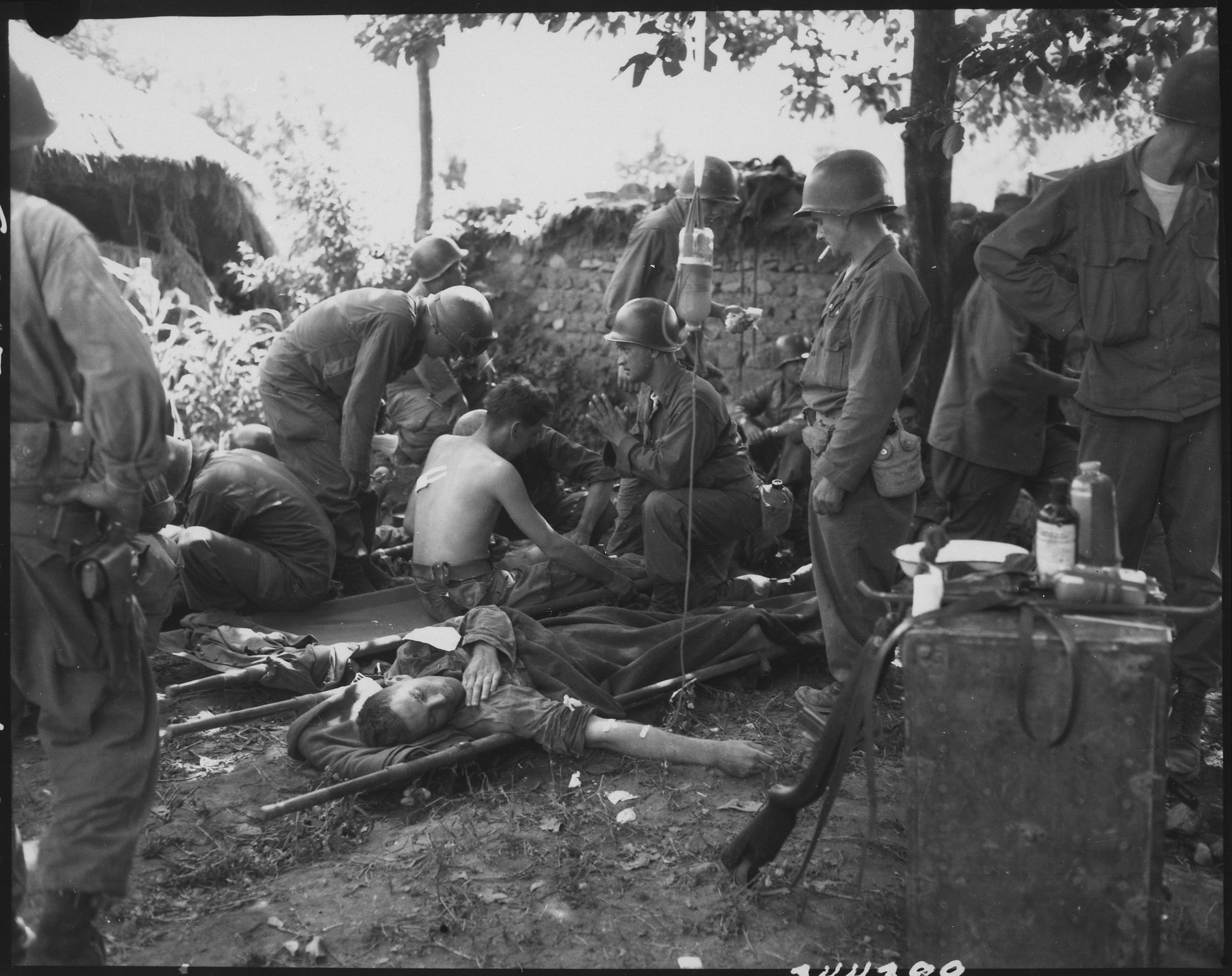
Wounded American soldiers receive treatment at an aid station in Korea.

During combat or training operations, military units may establish aid stations behind front lines to provide medical support to troops in the field. In United States military operations, these are most commonly referred to as Battalion Aid Stations; in Commonwealth countries, Regimental Aid Posts. The term "Main Aid Station" is also used depending on size and operational context. Aid stations are the smallest units, passing cases on to field ambulances and thence to casualty clearing stations.

During the Napoleonic Wars (1803–1815), the French established a tiered system of medical support services. Basic aid stations operated by one field medic were established as close to front lines as possible, sometimes within a few hundred meters to allow for the treatment of wounded troops as soon as possible. The more seriously injured were transported further back behind front lines to field hospitals in churches or nearby chateaus. Those who required more extensive treatment were transported again to much larger permanent "receiving" military hospitals in France.

Aid stations may also be established during training operations where the deployment of a "full hospital" is not required and the injuries treated are not as severe as those experienced during combat operations. In such situations, aid station medics provide "level one" care and treatment of non-life-threatening injuries or illness. There is generally no provision for treating "serious or life-threatening" problems beyond stabilization for transportation to a larger medical facility.

== Disaster response ==
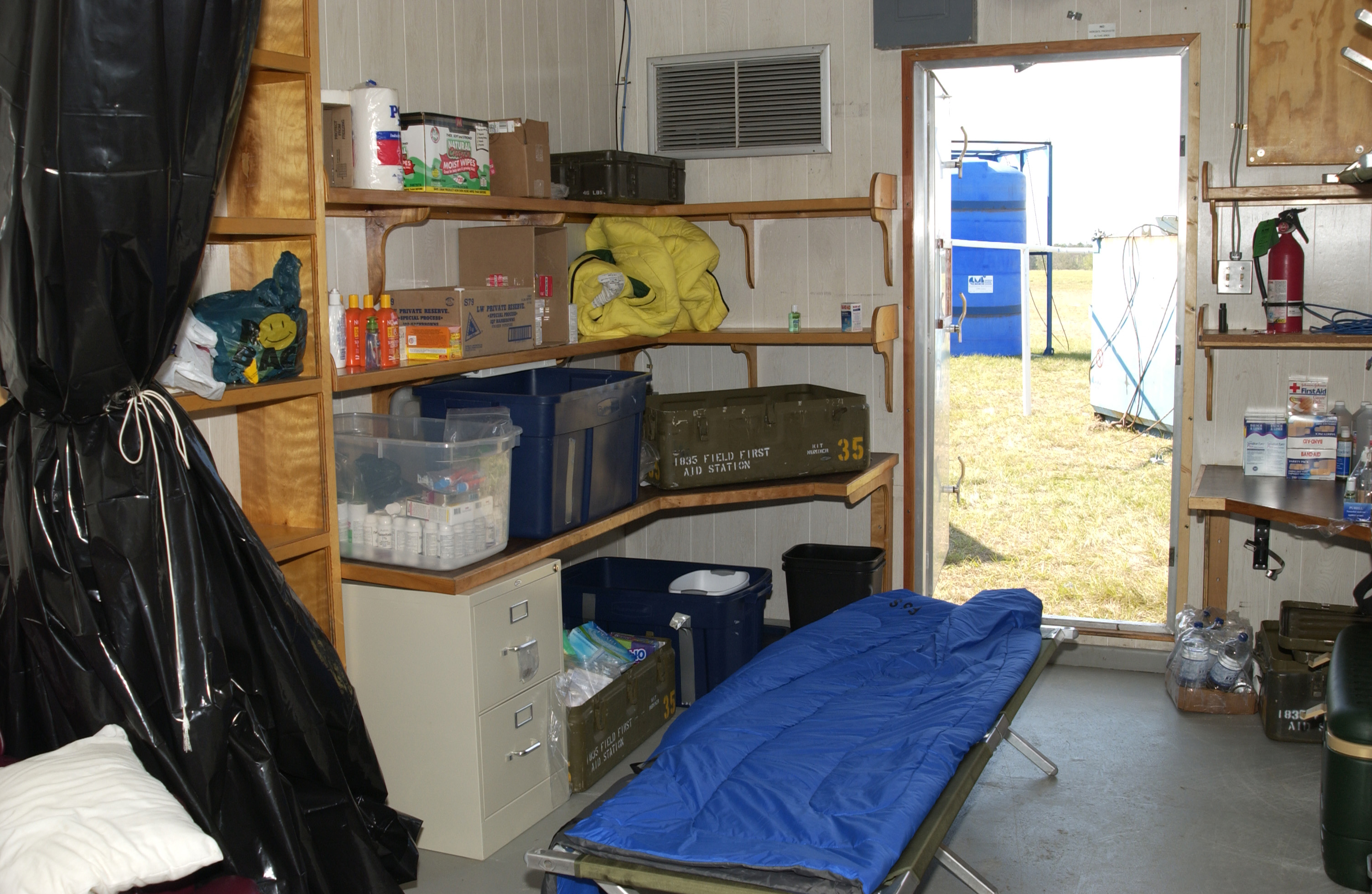
A temporary Federal Emergency Management Agency aid station

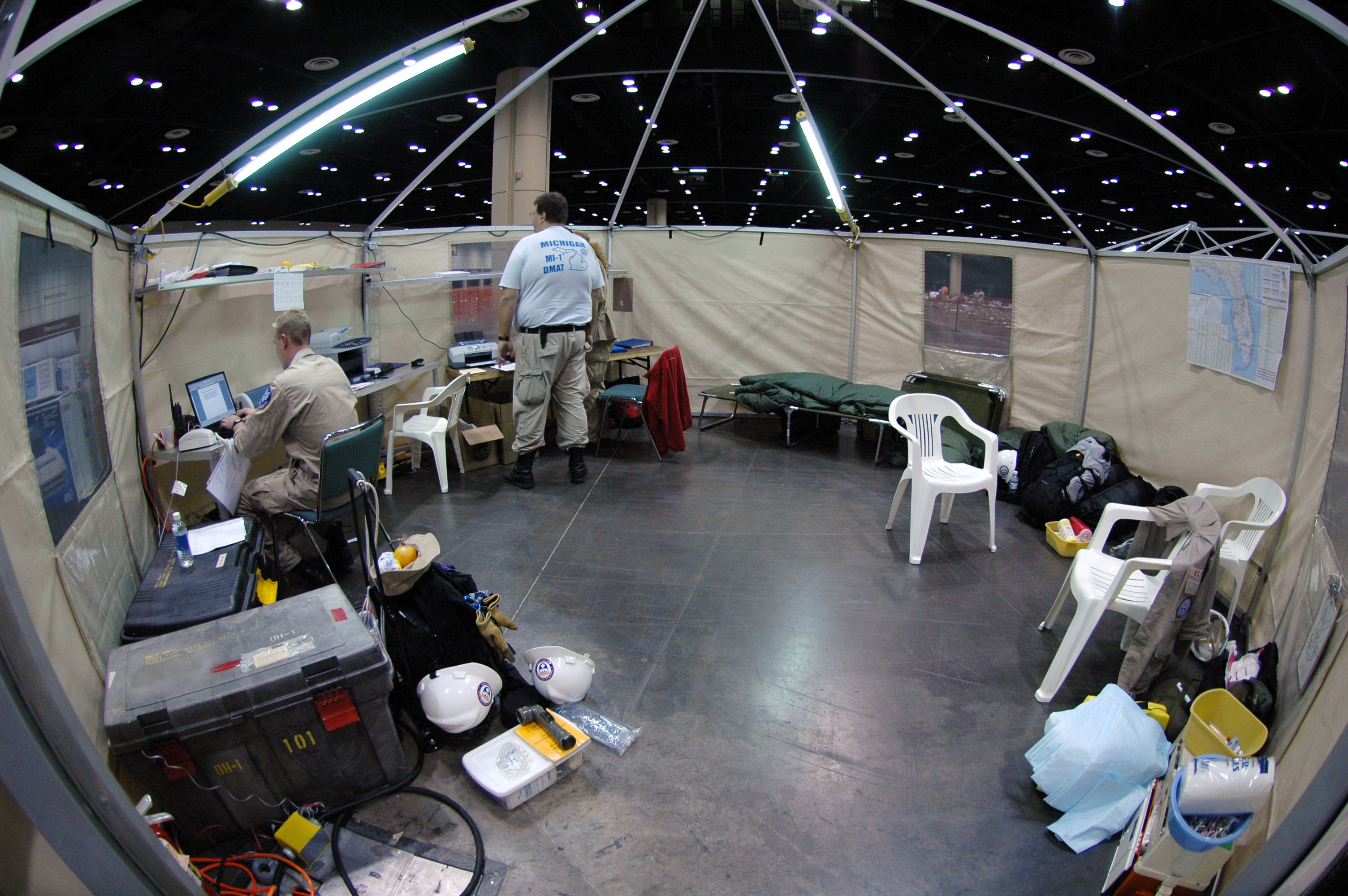
Inside a Disaster Medical Assistance Team aid station

In disaster areas, aid stations may be established to provide triage for injured persons or longer term support for those in need of food or shelter.

Aid stations may be established in response to both a natural and man-made disaster events and may remain in place for the duration of the disaster recovery effort or may be replaced by larger or more permanent facilities such as field or mobile hospitals. William L. Waugh gives the example of an aid station established during the aftermath of the Hyatt Regency walkway collapse and later replaced with more substantive triage facilities.

In the immediate aftermath of Hurricane Katrina, FEMA and the Red Cross established a number of emergency aid stations throughout New Orleans and near evacuation centers. These provided food, water, recovery supplies, medical aid and became a focal point of efforts to find missing persons. A number of privately owned facilities became makeshift aid stations including the bar, Johnny White's.

== See also ==
- First aid room (established room in a permanent structure)
- Mobile hospital
- Field hospital (large temporary medical facility)
- Rest area
- Ultramarathon
- Ironman Triathlon
- Jonathan Letterman (the "Father of Battlefield Medicine")
