= Alfred Henry Furlonger =

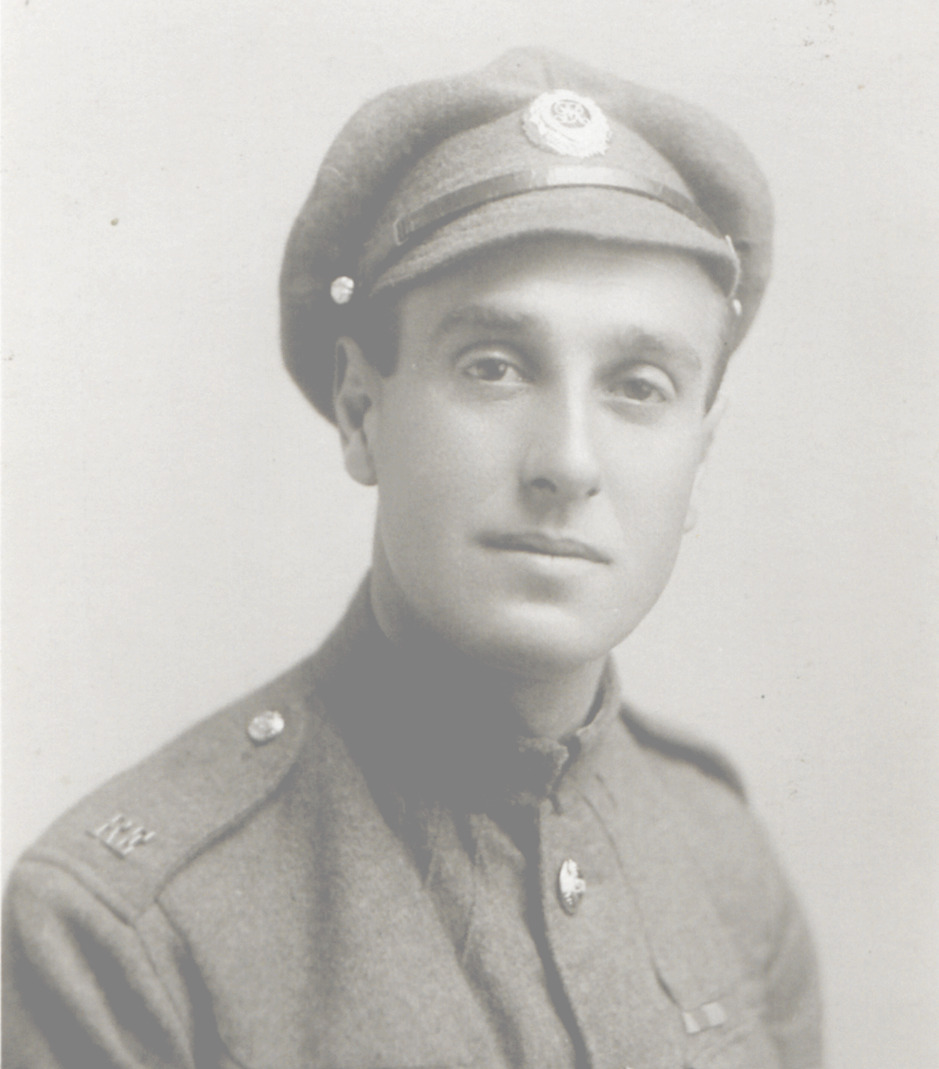
- Born: 1886/1887; Wimbledon, London
- Died: 30 April 1918 (aged 31); Poperinge, Belgium
- Burial place: Bandaghem Military Cemetery, Belgium
- Military career
- Allegiance: United Kingdom
- Branch: British Army
- Service years: 1914–1918
- Rank: Sergeant Major
- Unit: 29th Light Railway Operating Companies of the Royal Engineers
- Awards: Albert Medal; Distinguished Conduct Medal

Sergeant Major Alfred Henry Furlonger (1886/1887 – 30 April 1918) was a British soldier who served on the Western Front in World War I. He died while responding to a fire at a railway near Poperinge, Belgium, for which he was posthumously awarded the Albert Medal for Lifesaving.

== Early life ==
Furlonger was born in Wimbledon, London to parents Alfred Henry Furlonger and Mary Jane Steel. He was named after his father, who worked as a water fitter. His birth was registered at Kingston, Surrey, between October and November 1886 or 1887. He was baptised at the Church of The Holy Trinity and St Peter in Surrey on 30 January 1887. He had one sister, Maud Frances Furlonger, who was two years younger than him.

By the age of fourteen, he was working as a goods clerk.

He, at some point, took a trip to Chile and arrived back in England on 19 July 1914, at a port in Liverpool.

His Freemason membership was initiated on 16 Sep 1914.

== Military service and death ==
Furlonger joined the 29th Light Railway Operating Companies of the Royal Engineers Corps following the outbreak of World War I. He was awarded the Distinguished Conduct Medal for defending an evacuation train during the Third Battle of Ypres.

He conducted the trains as men were evacuating the wounded on 6 February 1918. There was a barrage of shells which stopped them from getting to the Regimental Aid Posts (RAPs). Furlonger organised a small party to mend the line and helped transfer the wounded onto another truck when it was immobilised

He eventually rose in rank from sergeant to an acting company Sergeant Major.

On 30 April 1918, Furlonger was working on a railway near Poperinge in Belgium. A train had been placed at the refilling point, and the engine was set to be detached. However, a fire broke out on one of the ammunition trucks. Furlonger ordered the men to tow the burning truck away from the rest of the train. Once far enough away, he and a small group attempted to uncouple the engine. The truck exploded, resulting in the death of him and four of his men.

== Honours ==
Furlonger and his men were awarded the Albert Medal For Lifesaving. In May 1918, he was buried in the Bandaghem Military Cemetery in Belgium with full military honours. His mother was sent a letter by his captain, J.H. Spalding, in which Furlonger was noted for his courageousness and good conduct. His probate was on 11th Sep 1918. He left most of his money to his mother, a total of 219 pounds and 15 shillings.
