= Caselani =

Italian coachbuilder

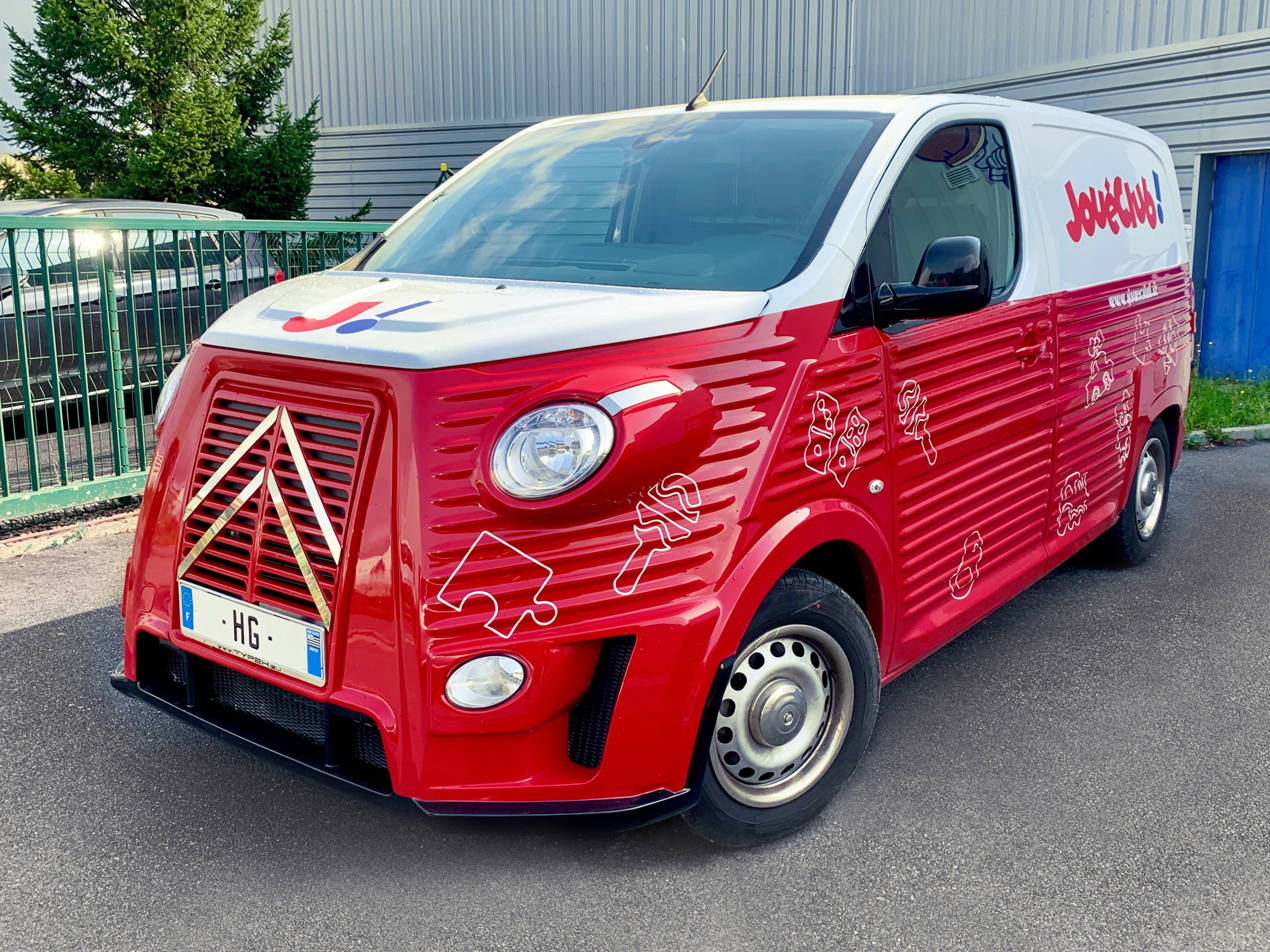
- Caselani Type HG in JouéClub colors.
- Key people: Fabrizio Caselani; David Obendorfer
- Website: en.typeh.eu

Caselani (full name Caselani Automobili) is an Italian coachbuilder, which notably offers modification kits for contemporary Citroën commercial vehicles in a retro style. Since 2017, Caselani has offered kits to modify a Citroën Jumper to give it a Citroën Type H appearance. In February 2018, the HG kit makes it possible to modify the Jumpy and Spacetourer (the two letters being linked respectively to the Type H and Type G). In October 2022, a kit was unveiled to make the Citroën Berlingo look like a 2CV Fourgonnette, due to be launched in January 2023.

== History ==
"We did not only want to copy the shapes of the original model, but to capture the soul of this legendary vehicle, reinterpreting it with a nostalgic composite material covering, while giving it a resolutely contemporary style."

—Fabrizio Caselani

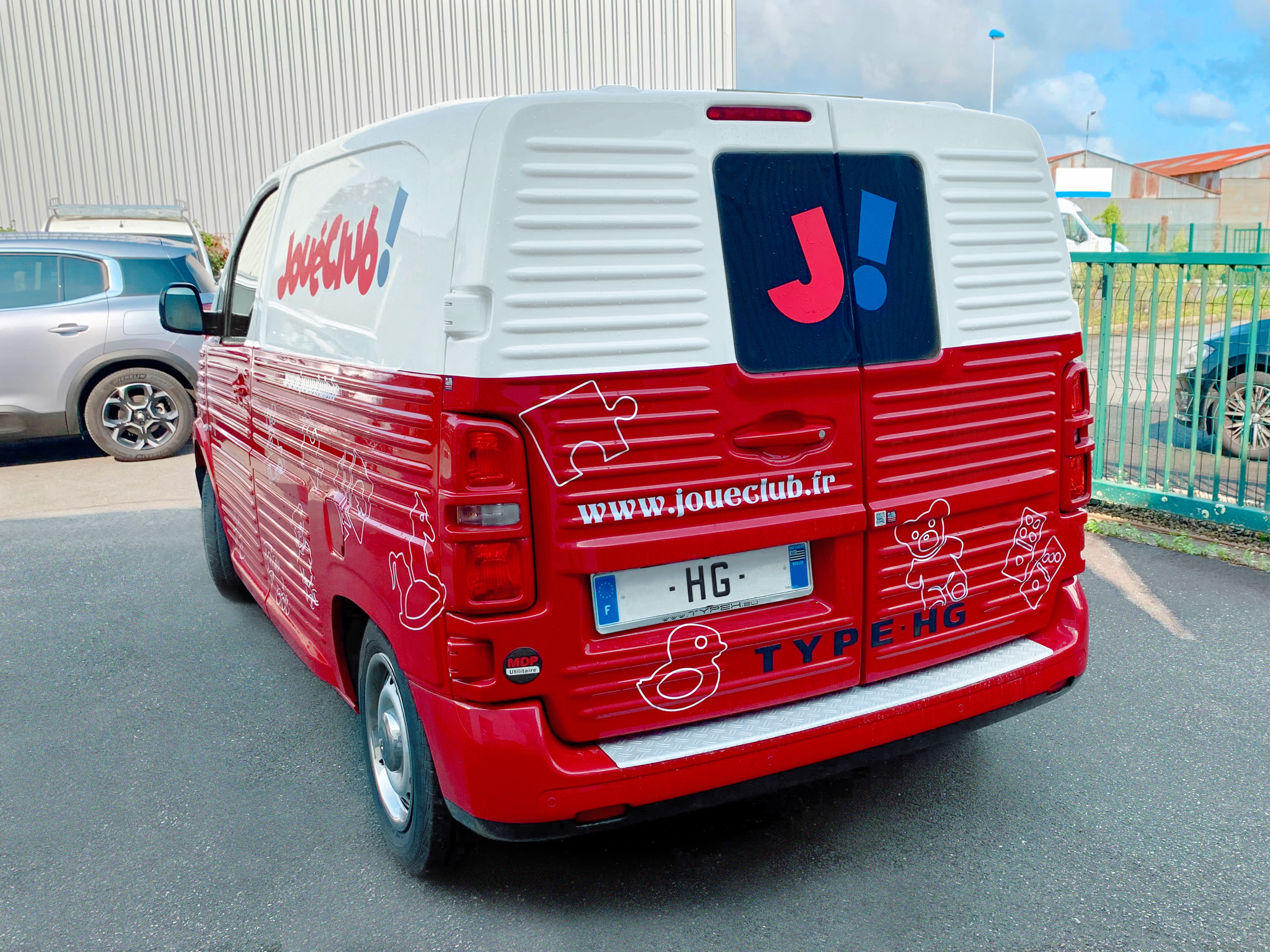
Rear of the Citroën Jumpy Type HG in JouéClub colors.

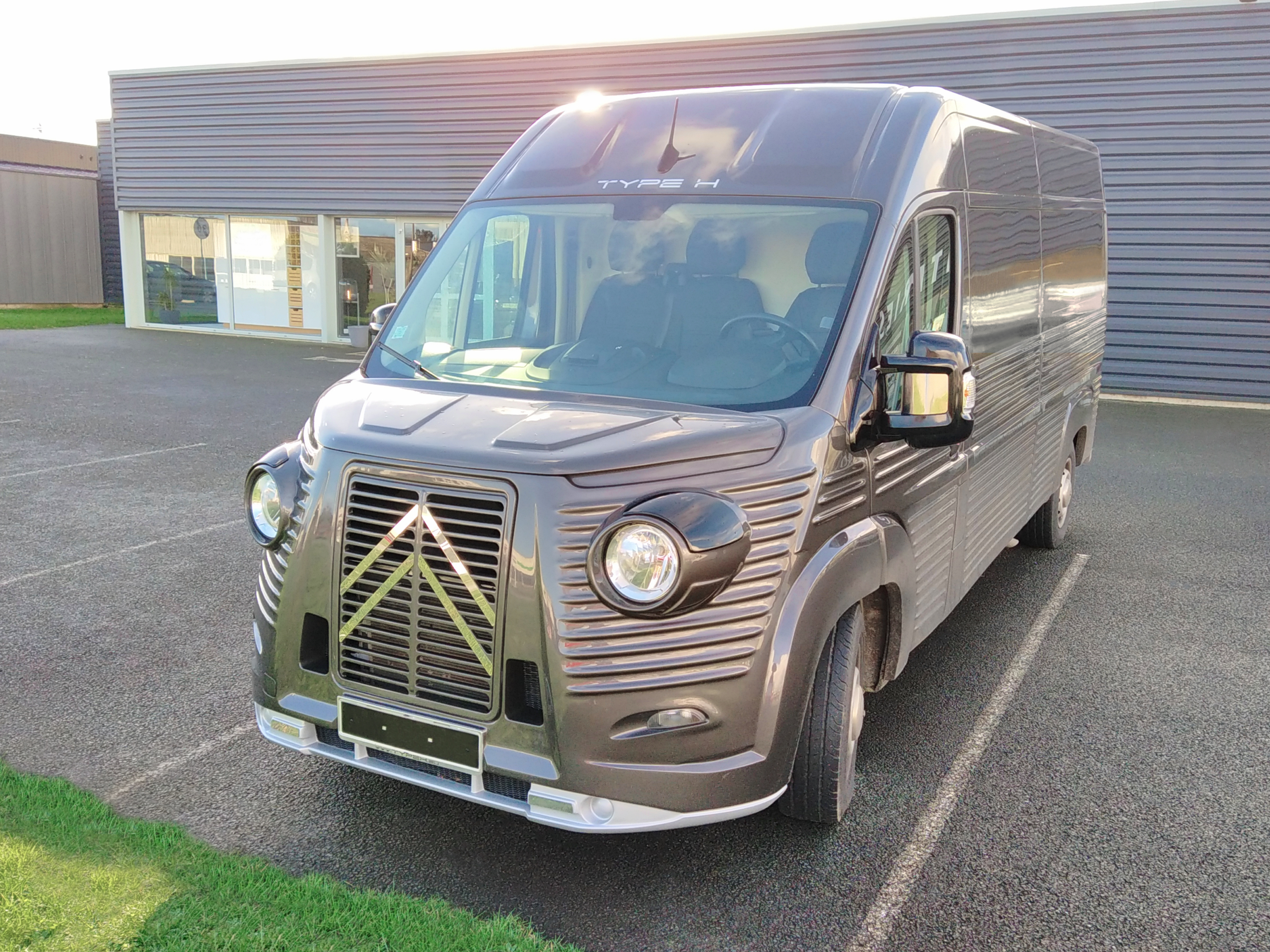
A Citroën Jumper (or Peugeot Boxer, or even Fiat Ducato) dressed with a body kit by Caselani to transform it into a Citroën Type H Neo-retro.

Married with three daughters, Fabrizio Caselani often travels across Europe in his 1970 Citroën HY which he trusts for their long journeys. He then conceived the idea of having a vehicle with modern safety standards to use with his family, without giving up the line of the old model, one of his favorite vehicles.

The makeover of a Citroën Jumper was born in 2017, on the occasion of the 70th anniversary of the Type H. Fabrizio Caselani, founder of Caselani Automobili, enthusiast and collector of Citroën vehicles, joined forces with designer David Obendorfer, who previously officiated within studios specializing in yachting and automobile design. They are both fascinated and influenced by the Italian Flaminio Bertoni, the designer of the most prestigious cars of the Citroën brand: the Traction Avant, the 2CV, the DS and the Ami 6. To pay homage to him and perpetuate the Italian know-how, the two partners worked for more than a year to design a unique transformation kit of its kind.

Thus, since 2017, Caselani has offered kits to modify a Citroën Jumper to give it the appearance of a H Van. In February 2018, an HG kit was offered to modify the Jumpy and the Spacetourer (the two letters being linked to the H Van and G Van respectively).

From January 2023, the Citroën Berlingo can be transformed into a reinterpreted 2CV AU type van Fourgonnette from the 1950s. It uses the corrugated metal style on the sides, rear and roof. All components of the body kit are assembled by hand in the Caselani workshops in Sospiro, northern Italy. For this project, Caselani teamed up with designers from Citroën. The entire process remains artisanal, from the rolling of the glass fiber bodywork elements to the final painting.

The different kits are made up of exterior bodywork elements and accessories: GRP (Fiberglass Reinforced Polyester) panels, round headlights, electrical wiring, radiator grille, double chevron, painted or chrome accessories and fixing elements. The panels are glued directly to the body of the van, on the sides and rear (and on the roof depending on the model). Only the front is partly dismantled and replaced by a specific face which gives the entire identity of the Type H or the 2CV.

Caselani offers different adaptations for personal or professional use, depending on the model chosen in the Jumper range: open or glazed, compact size (L1H1 – 4.96 m) or long (L4H2 – 6.36 m). Variations are also offered in food truck, camper van or even tow truck versions. Eight basic colors have been defined to recall the retro spirit of the Type H. In 2024, Caselani is tackling the Chevrons' mini electric model, the Citroën Ami, renamed Type Ami for the occasion. This re-bodied quadricycle plays the nostalgia card just like the Fiat Topolino. From October 19 to 20, 2024, two prototypes of the Ami Caselani in “flashy colors” are present in preview near the Spa-Francrochamps in Belgium on the sidelines of the 24 Hours 2CV (an endurance event bringing together 118 crews entered on 2CVs but also Citroën C1): one blue, the other orange. The small production car has changed a lot since it is covered with body panels inspired by the HY of 1948. As on the utility vehicles retouched by the Italian coachbuilder, we find at the front, the circular headlights, the prominent chevrons and the famous “pig nose” reminiscent of the van of the late 1940s. The sheet metal rims, the shape of the small round mirrors, the small rear lights and the false side window dividers, 2CV style, finish making this Ami truly special.

Jumper and Jumpy disguised as Type H

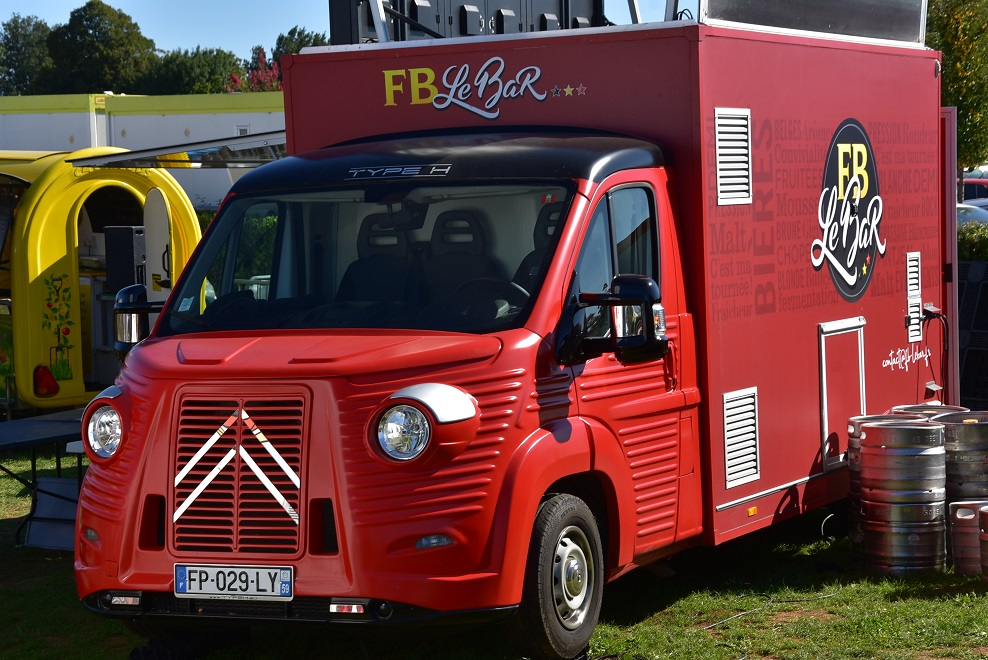
A Fiat Ducato III modified into Type H from Caselani.

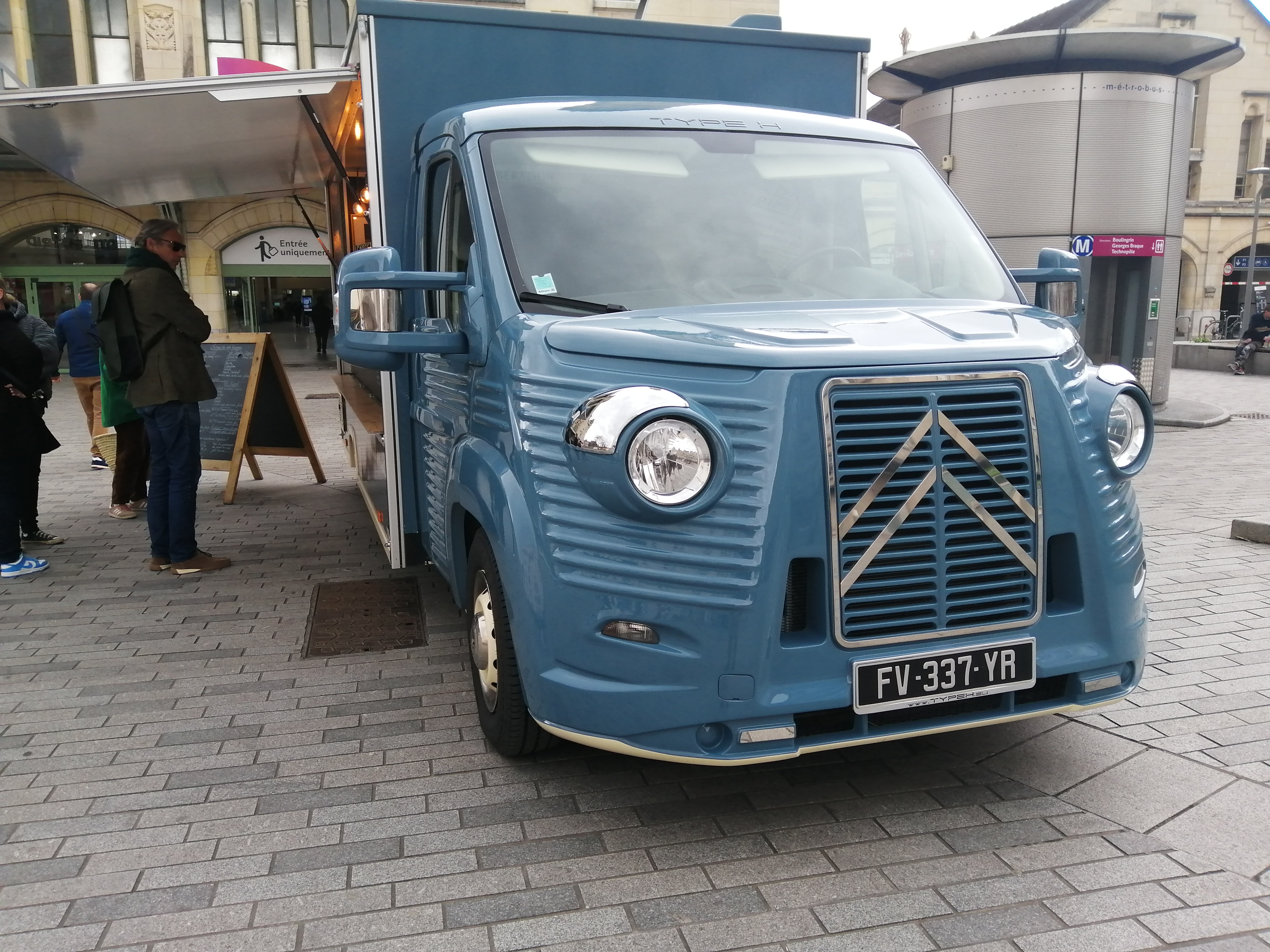
Citroën Jumper dressed as Type H by Caselani (2023). Here, a food truck version in front of Rouen station.

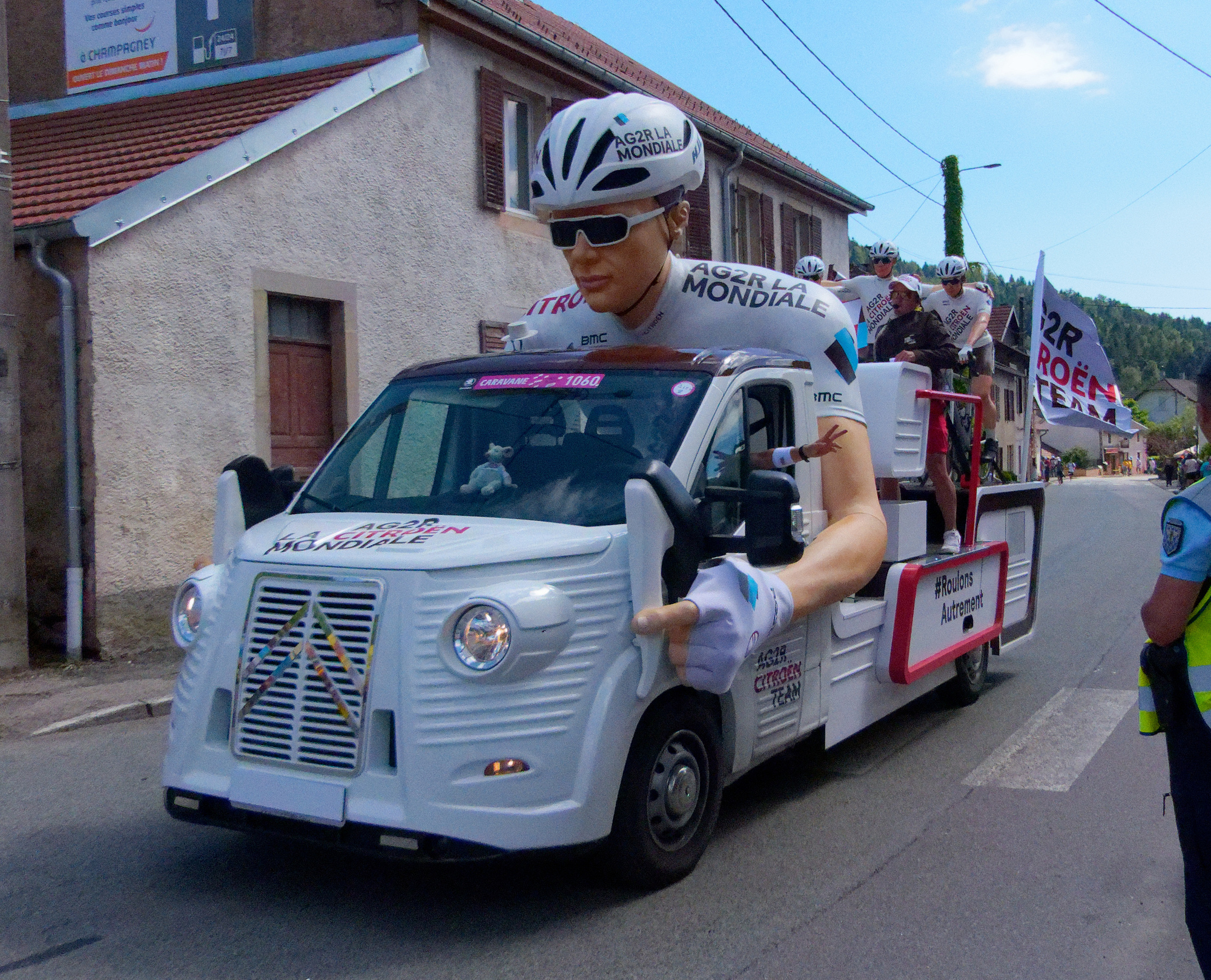
Citroën Jumper/Type H of the Tour de France caravan during the 2022 edition in Plancher-les-Mines.

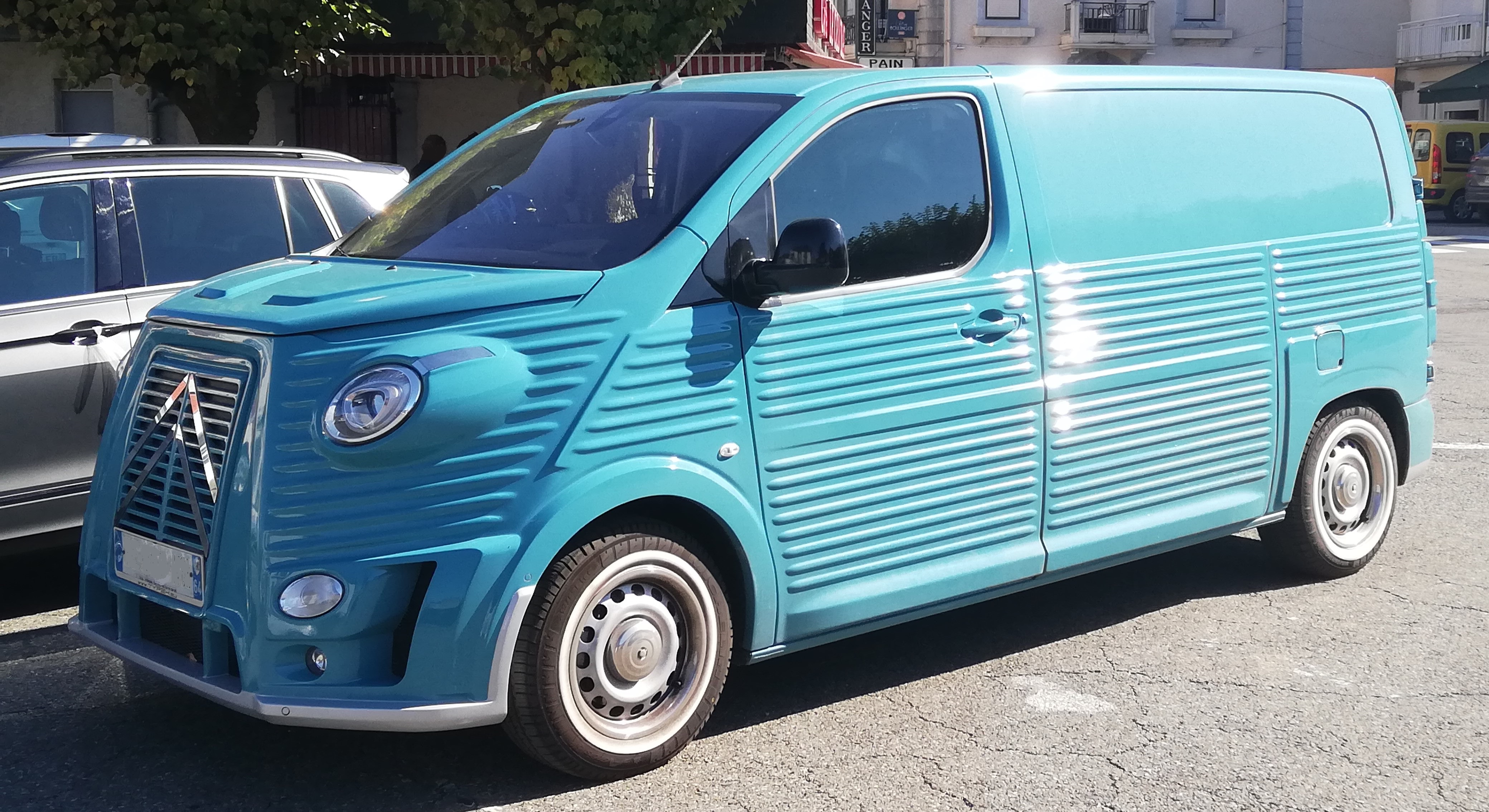
A Citroen Jumpy with Type HG bodywork.

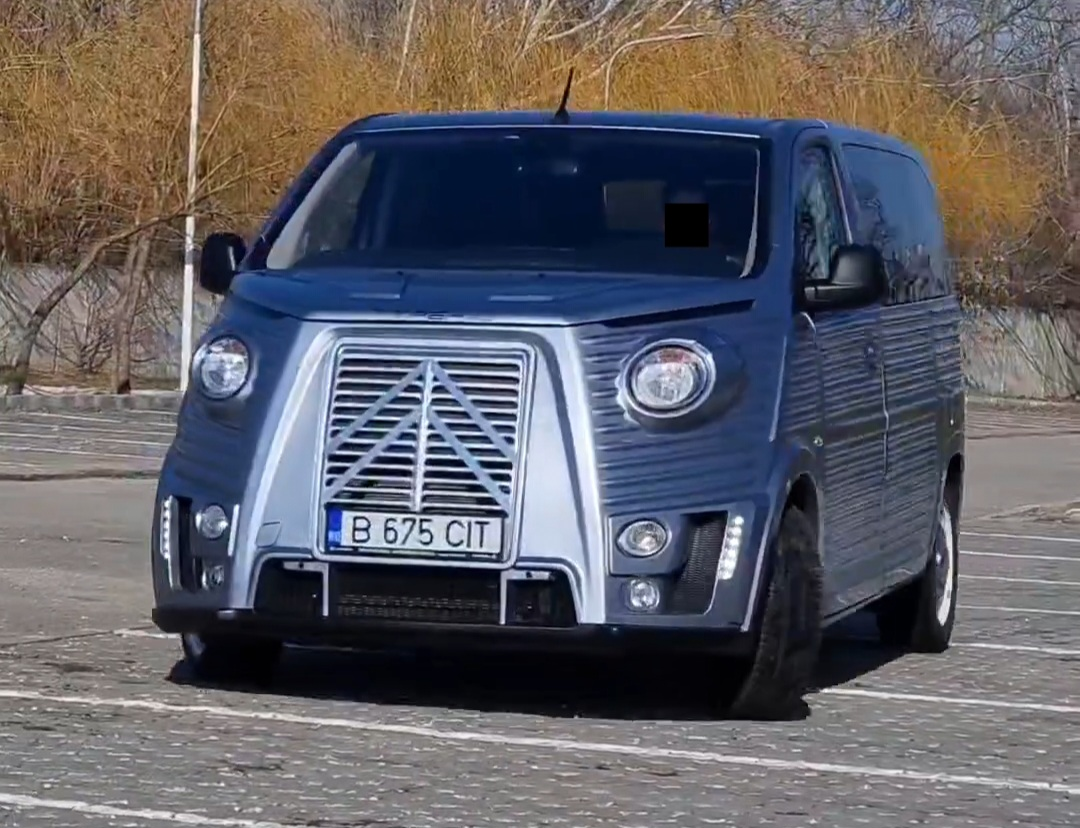
Front side of Jumpy-HG.

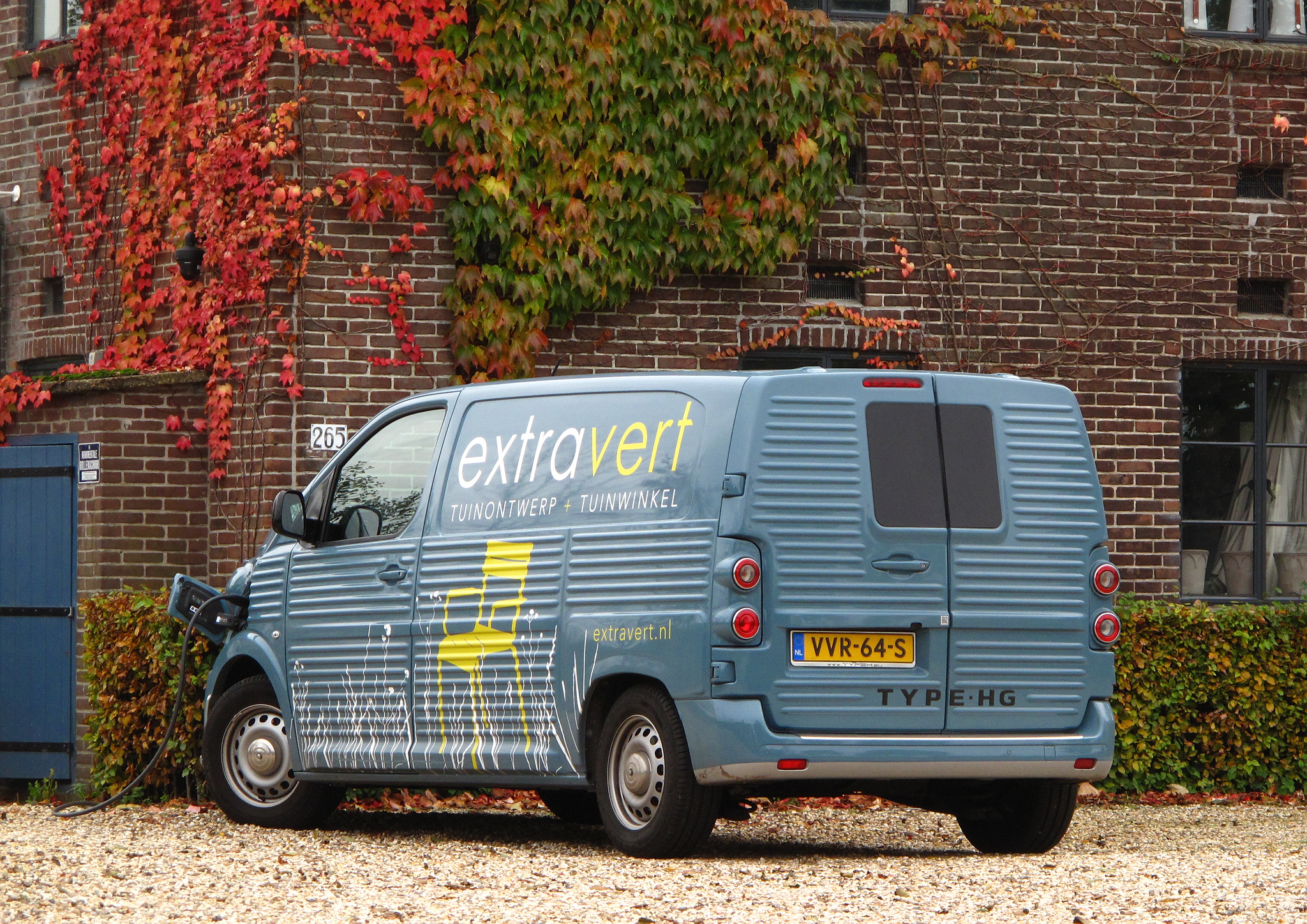
Rear view of an electric ë-Jumpy-HG charging.

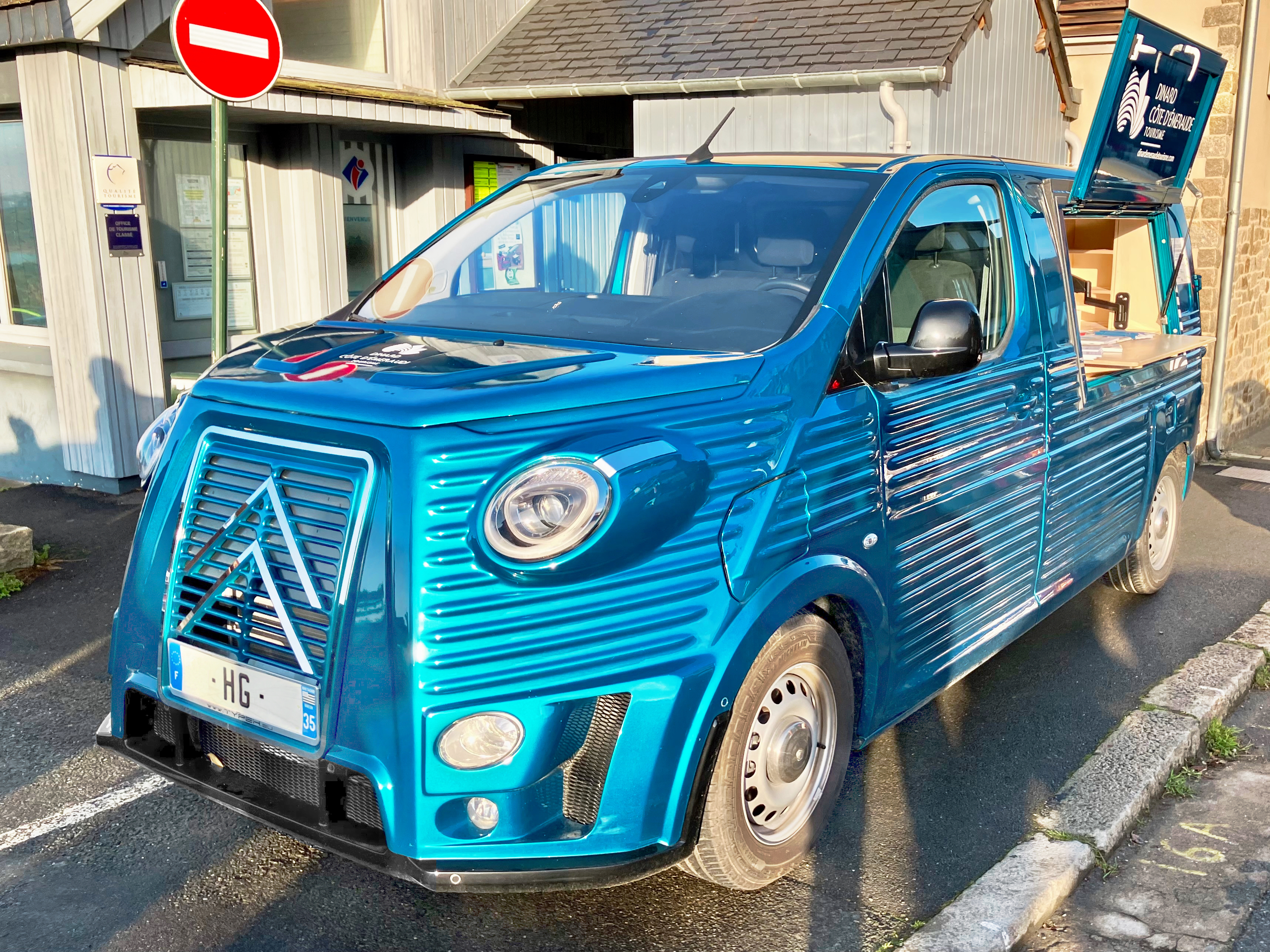
Citroën Jumper/Caselani Type HG...

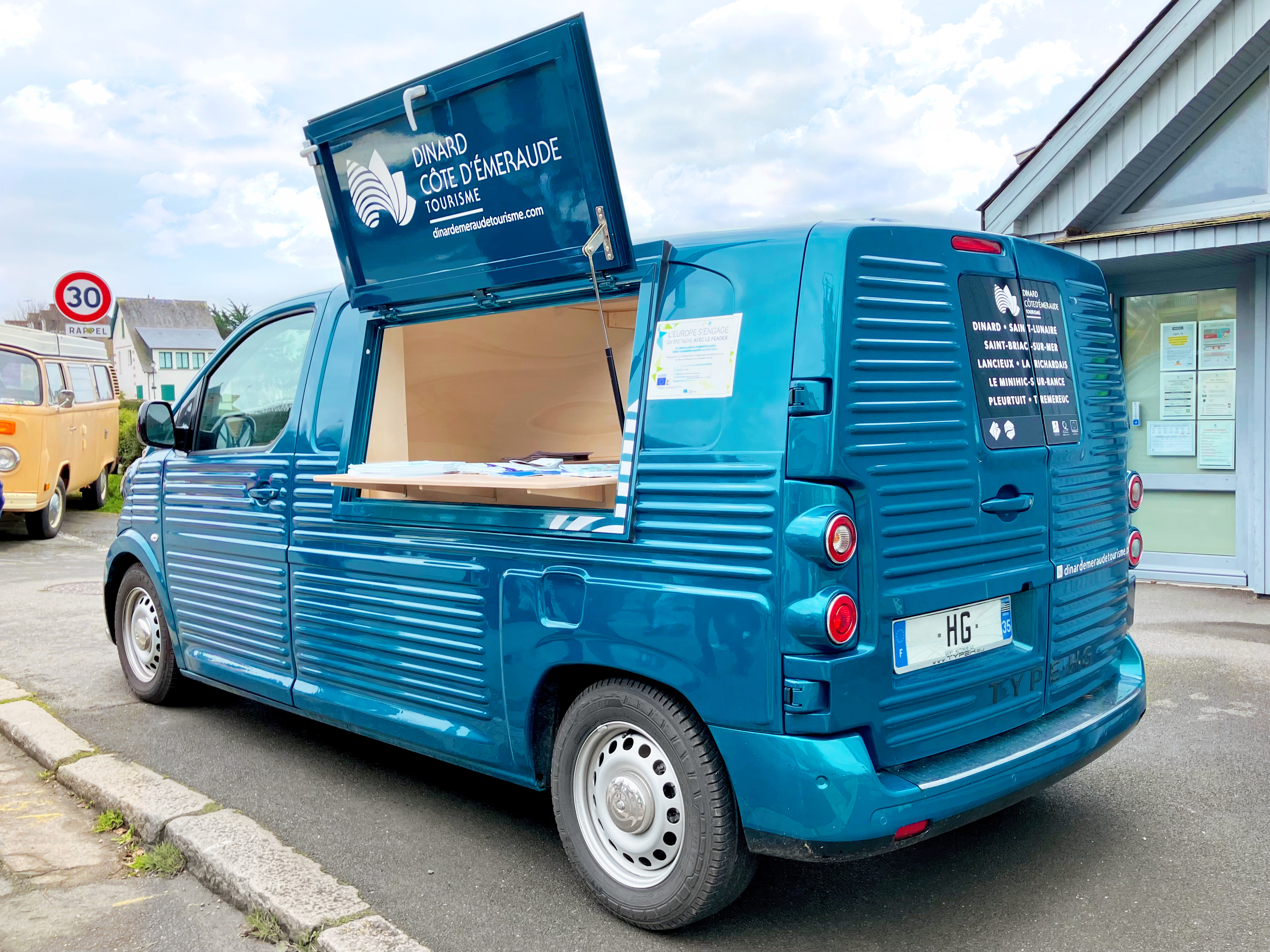
... hybrid in Brittany.

== Models ==
- Fourgonnette
- Type Ami
- Type HG
- Type H
- 4PE
- 616N
