= Citroën G Van =

G Van
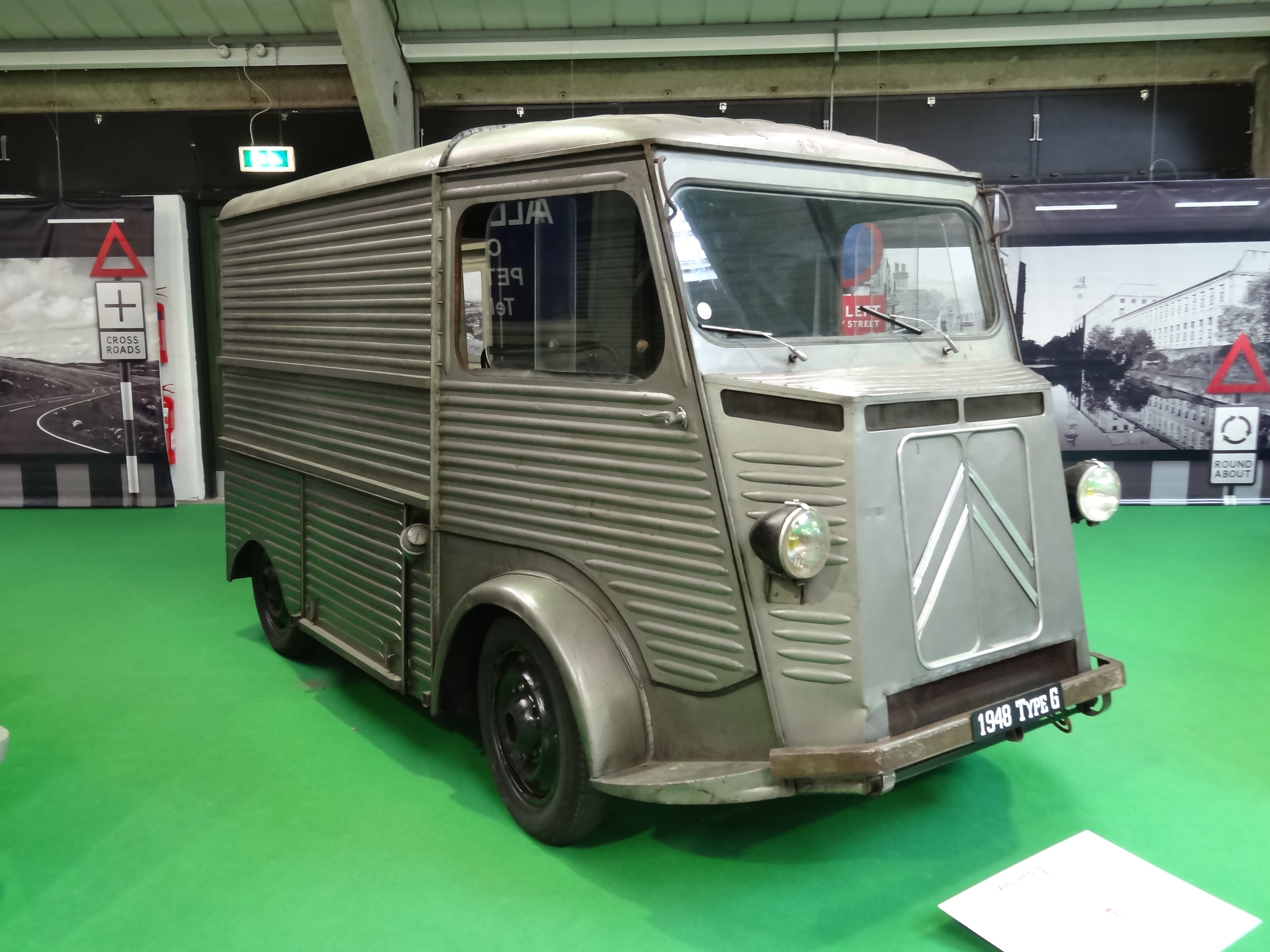

Overview
- Type: Van
- Manufacturer: Citroën
- Also called: Type G
- Model years: 1948
- Designer: André Lefèbvre

Body and chassis
- Body style: 2-door panel van
- Layout: Front-engine, front-wheel-drive
- Doors: 2
- Related: Citroën H Van

Powertrain
- Engine: 602 cc H2 air-cooled 29 hp (22 kW).

Dimensions
- Wheelbase: 2,000mm
- Length: 3,470mm
- Width: 1,680mm
- Height: 2,030mm

The Citroën G Van was the 1948 prototype built by Citroën of a small truck which looked like a scaled down version of the H Van, and equipped with an enlarged version of the 2CV flat twin enlarged to 475 cc. Front suspension was akin to that of the 2 CV but with twin suspension arms, while the springing medium was by torsion bars front and rear.

It was never put into production. The decision was made to employ the 2 CV running gear instead in the AZU/AK series, which had a lower volumetric efficiency. One copy of the G Van has survived till today and is on display at Conservatoire Citroën, The Private Museum in Paris.

== Type HG ==
In 2020 Caselani, an Italy-based coach builder, developed their Type HG body kit for the Citroën Jumpy van, inspired by the original G van's design cues like the vertical grill, far out headlights and corrugated body panels. Caselani offers the body kit in passenger van, crew-cab van, and panel van versions, all for the short-wheel-based Jumpy van powered by a 100-horsepower, four-cylinder turbo diesel engine.

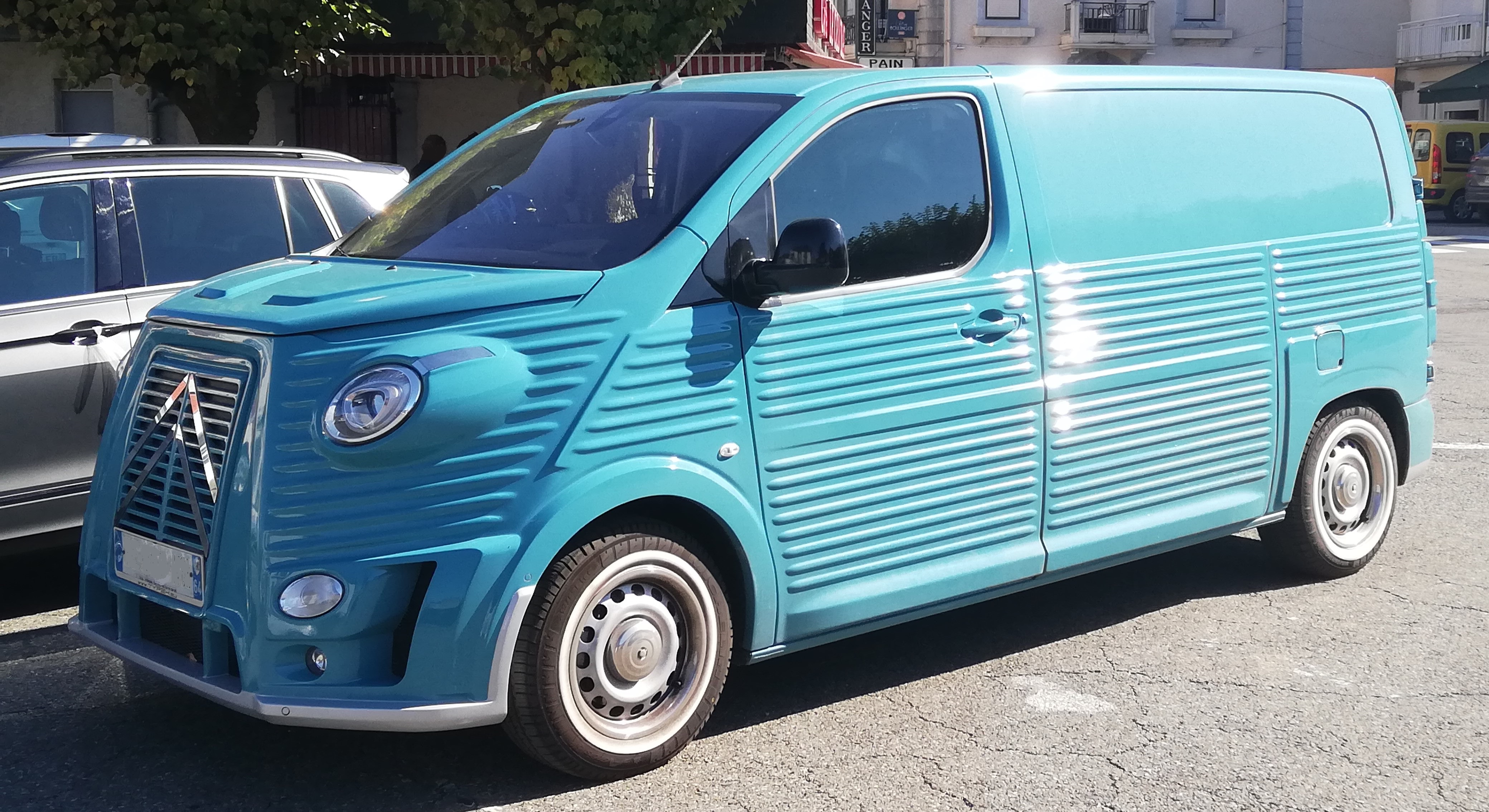
Caselani Type HG Panel Van based on Citroën Jumpy

The kit was developed with the help of Citroën and is licensed by the manufacturer. The coach builder has also developed two more body kits based on the H van and 2CV.

== See also ==
- Citroën H Van
- Fiat Ducato
- Citroën Jumpy
- Citroën 2CV
- Volkswagen Type 2
- Caselani
