= Casualty Clearing Station =

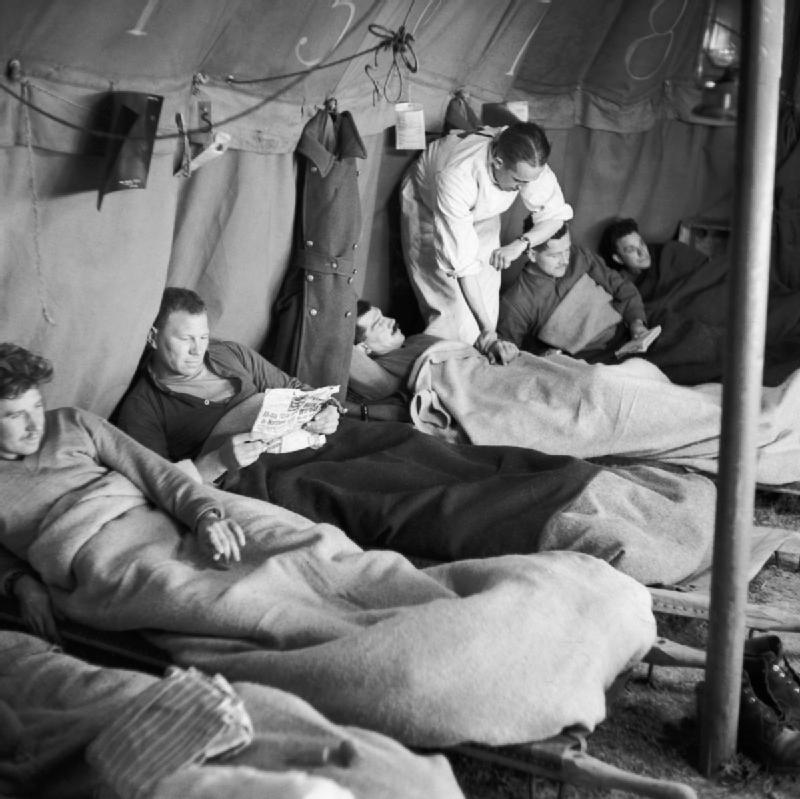
A British Army doctor examines patients at a casualty clearing station in Tunisia, February 1943

In the British Army and other Commonwealth militaries, a Casualty Clearing Station (CCS) is a military medical facility behind the front lines that is used to treat wounded soldiers. A CCS would usually be located just beyond the range of enemy artillery and often near transportation facilities (e.g., a railway). The CCS receives battlefield casualties from regimental aid posts located in the combat zone. Casualties that cannot be adequately treated in the CCS are stabilized there before being transported to a field hospital or military hospital.

== History ==
On 1 March 1970, the Royal Army Medical Corps went through an internal reorganisation which saw the old medical designations replaced by modern terms. The old casualty clearing stations became field hospitals (a term which later disappeared in 2023), and the old field dressing stations became field ambulances. The new field hospitals were non-mobile units designed to take care of, run, and maintain rear hospitals. The field ambulances meanwhile, as the name would suggest, were mobile units equipped with Land Rover Ambulances which would support units on the battlefield.

== See also ==
- Royal Army Medical Corps
- Aid station
