= Broom wagon =

Vehicle following a cycle road race

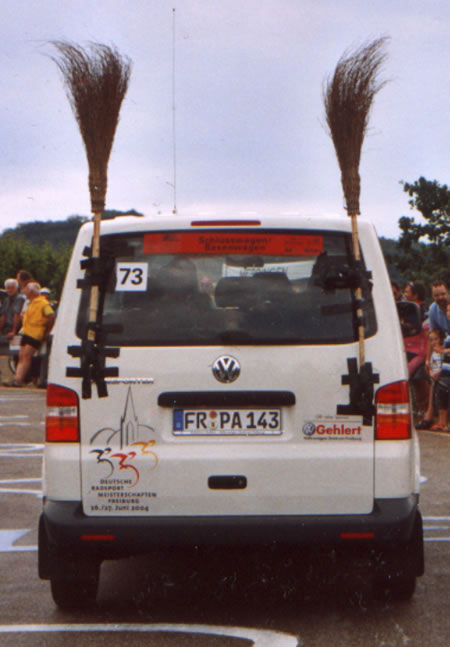
Broom wagon, German cycling road race

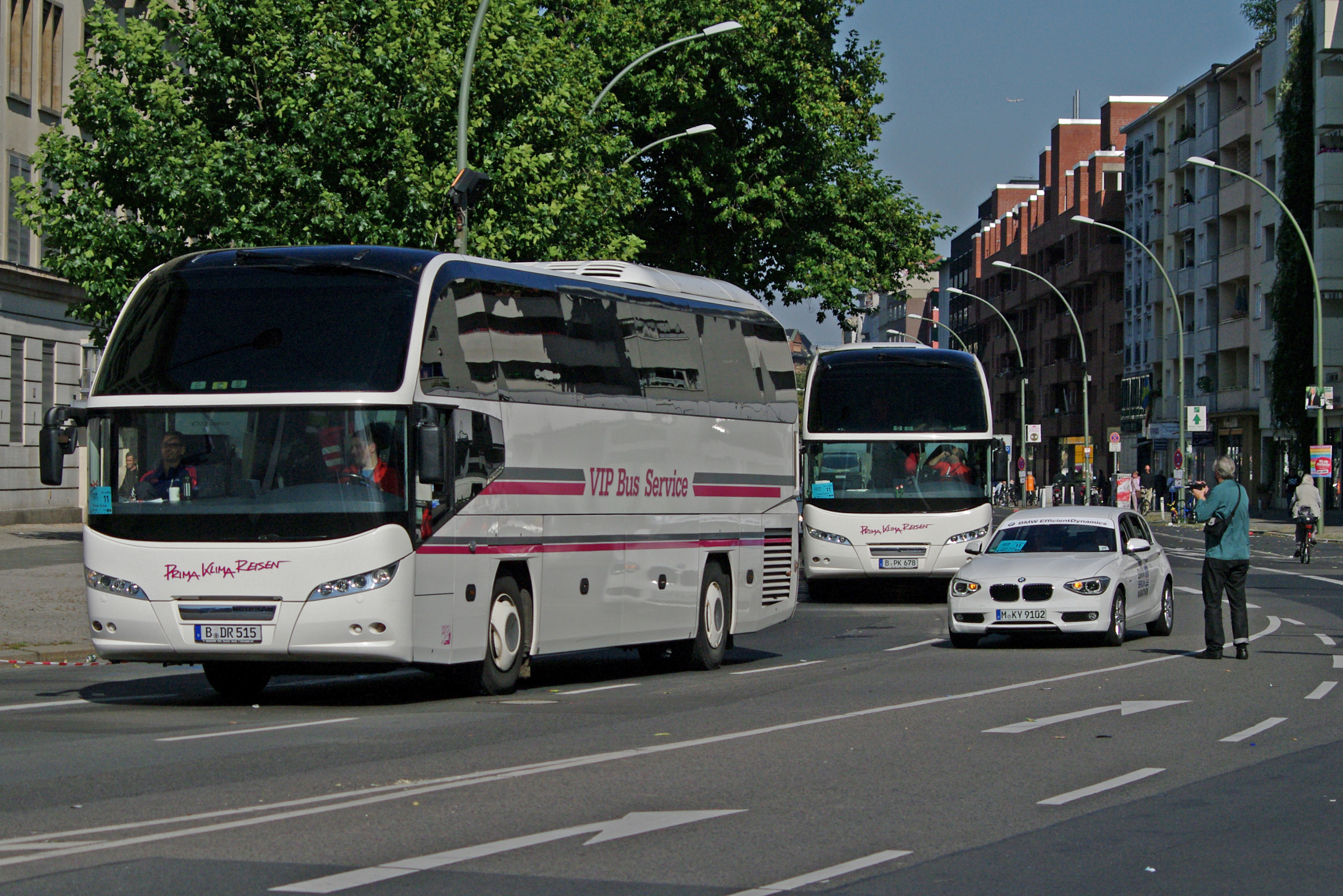
Broom wagons, Berlin Marathon

A broom wagon (also known as a SAG wagon: "Supplies and Gear" wagon) is a vehicle that follows a cycling road race "sweeping" up stragglers who are unable to make it to the finish within the time permitted. If a cyclist chooses to continue behind the broom wagon, they cease to be part of the convoy (and the race), and must then follow the usual traffic rules and laws. Though the nominal function of the broom wagon is to collect riders who cannot continue to race, its operators will often provide words of comfort and support to a dropped rider, encouraging them to persevere.

While The Broom Wagon is used to assist fatigued riders by allowing them to ride within the vehicle when they have fallen to the back of a race, this often leads to a rider's disqualification due to time cuts. However, in some instances, the Broom Wagon is able to assist and help riders back into their saddle, allowing them to finish within the time cut. During stage six of the 2001 HP Women's Challenge, Emily Westbrook of the Contender Bicycles team had fallen twice and was close to giving up the race. Eva Overlie was driving the Broom Wagon when she happened upon Westbrook. Checking the time and length to finish, Overlie wagered Westbrook still had time to complete the stage within the time cut. Overlie provided encouragement and basic triage, helping Westbrook to rally and finish the race just 15 seconds before the cut-off.

== History ==
In the Tour de France, the vehicle used was traditionally a Citroën H Van. The expression "broom wagon" is a translation of the French, voiture balai, and it was seen first at the 1910 Tour. The broom wagon of the Tour de France did indeed once carry a broom fixed above the driver's cab—except in the years that it was sponsored by a vacuum-cleaner company. Likewise, in other road cycling races, it is not rare to see real brooms affixed to the broom wagon.

The use of broom wagons has expanded to other sports events—especially in marathon events, a broom wagon is a common feature. In marathons, many amateur runners join in and sometimes are not able to reach the finish line within the allocated time. The broom wagon puts an end to their race, and the runners have to hand in their numbers. Also, off-road races like the Dakar Rally have come to use a broom wagon that follows on the track, picking up motorists who have broken down.

== Broom bike ==
In trail races, there is usually a "broom bike". Bigger races use a motorcycle, but smaller events will use a race marshal on a bicycle. He "sweeps" the course to ensure that it is clear. While unable to pick up incapacitated competitors, the broom bike may offer limited mechanical assistance and phone for assistance.

== Recreational ==
The Broom Wagon has also become popular for use with bicycling trip enthusiasts and guide services. Companies such as Backroads use a Broom Wagon to follow vacationers who book their bicycling trip services. This allows these companies to fully stock the vehicles with wine, kitchens, and gear, creating a luxurious experience for travelers. Additionally, guide services may offer to tow the cyclist's gear, such as camping tents and supplies. This allows the rider to ride many miles unencumbered by gear; this is particularly helpful for multi-day trips.
