= Regimental Aid Post =

In the British Army, Canadian Forces and other Commonwealth militaries, the Regimental Aid Post (RAP) is a front-line military medical establishment incorporated into an infantry battalion or armoured regiment for the immediate treatment and triage of battlefield casualties. In the US forces, the equivalent is the Battalion Aid Station. The term has been used continuously since the First World War or earlier.

The RAP has traditionally been staffed by the unit's Medical Officer, a Medical NCO, and a small number of medical orderlies. Additionally, units have employed stretcher-bearers, and more recently trained medics, for the evacuation and immediate treatment of battlefield casualties.

The RAP has usually been the first stop in the evacuation chain for seriously injured personnel, who are then transported to casualty clearing stations and other larger medical units further to the rear. RAPs are not usually equipped to provide surgical treatment or long-term care.

== See also ==
- Aid station
