= Johnny White's =

Bar in New Orleans

Coordinates: 29.95851°N 90.06541°W

Johnny White's was a bar in New Orleans known for remaining open despite Hurricane Katrina. It closed in 2020.
