= Citroën H Van =

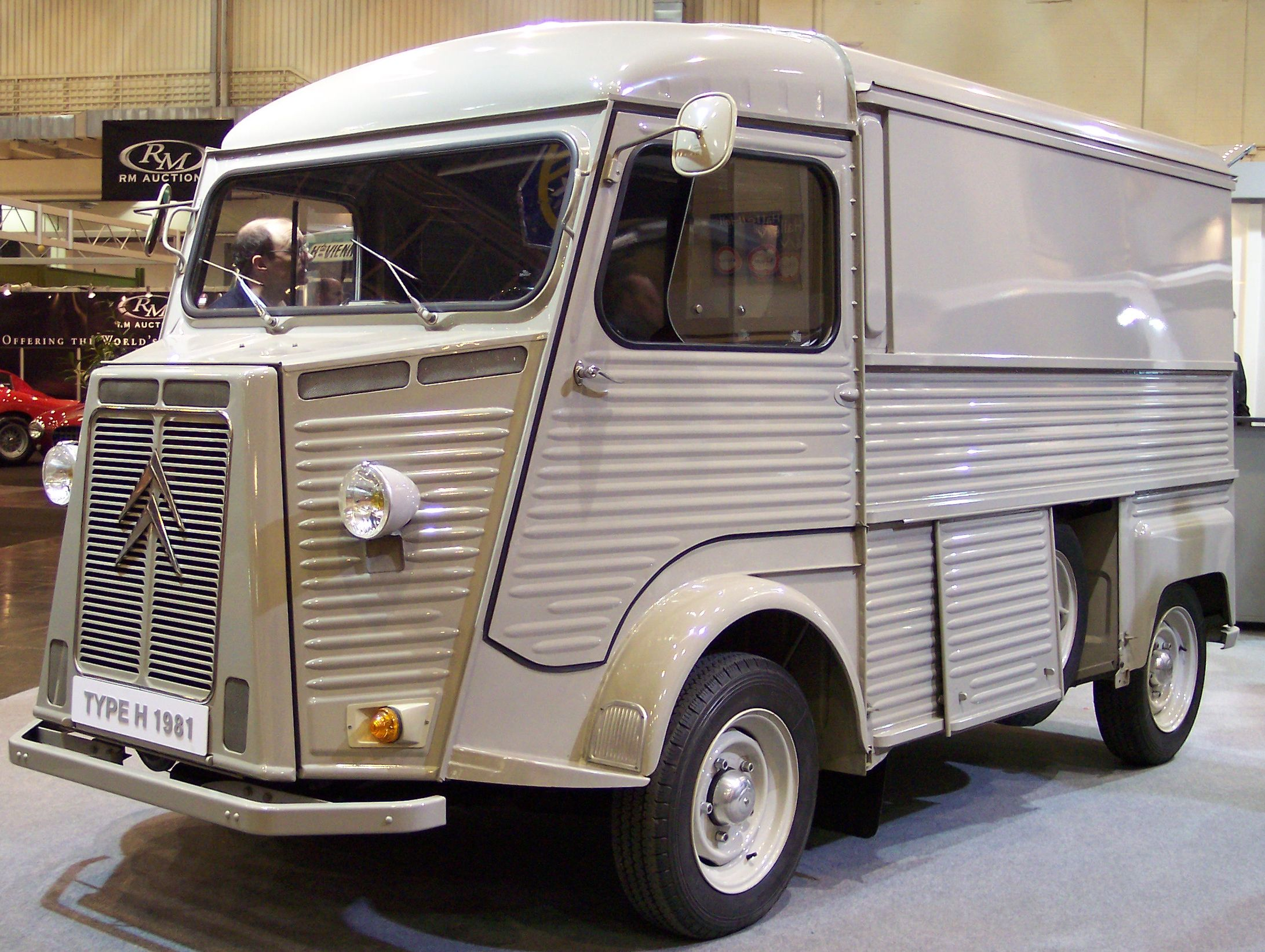
- Front 3/4 view showing spare wheel compartment: post-1969 model with rectangular rear wings and suicide doors

Overview
- Manufacturer: Citroën
- Production: 1947–1981
- Assembly: France: Paris; Spain: Vigo (Vigo Plant); Portugal: Mangualde (Mangualde Plant)
- Designer: Flaminio Bertoni, André Lefèbvre

Body and chassis
- Class: Light commercial vehicle (M)
- Body style: 4- and 5-door panel vans; (flat-bed) pickup (type HP)
- Layout: FF layout

Powertrain
- Engine: Petrol: 1628 cc type 72 I4; 1911 cc 11D/type 78 I4; Diesel: 1621 cc Perkins 4.99 I4; 1816 cc Indenor TMD85 I4; 1948 cc Indenor XD88 I4
- Transmission: 3-speed manual, single dry plate clutch

Dimensions
- Wheelbase: 2,500 mm (98.4 in) (base)
- Length: 4,260 mm (167.7 in) (base)
- Width: 2,000 mm (78.7 in)
- Height: 2,340 mm (92.1 in) (base)
- Kerb weight: 1,400 kg (3,086.5 lb) (base)

Chronology
- Predecessor: Citroën TUB
- Successor: Citroën C35; Citroën C25

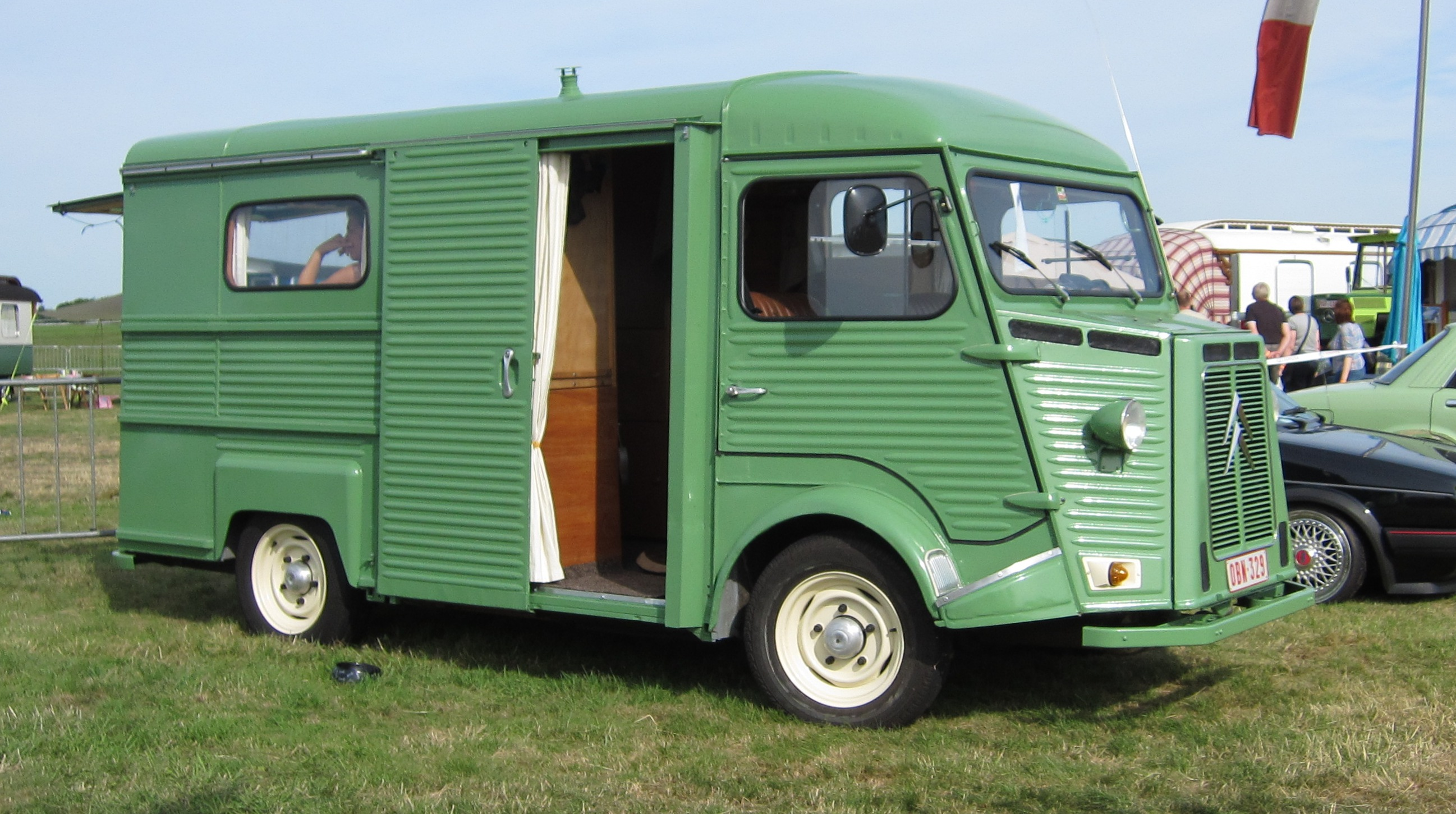
Near-side sliding door and front-hinged driver doors

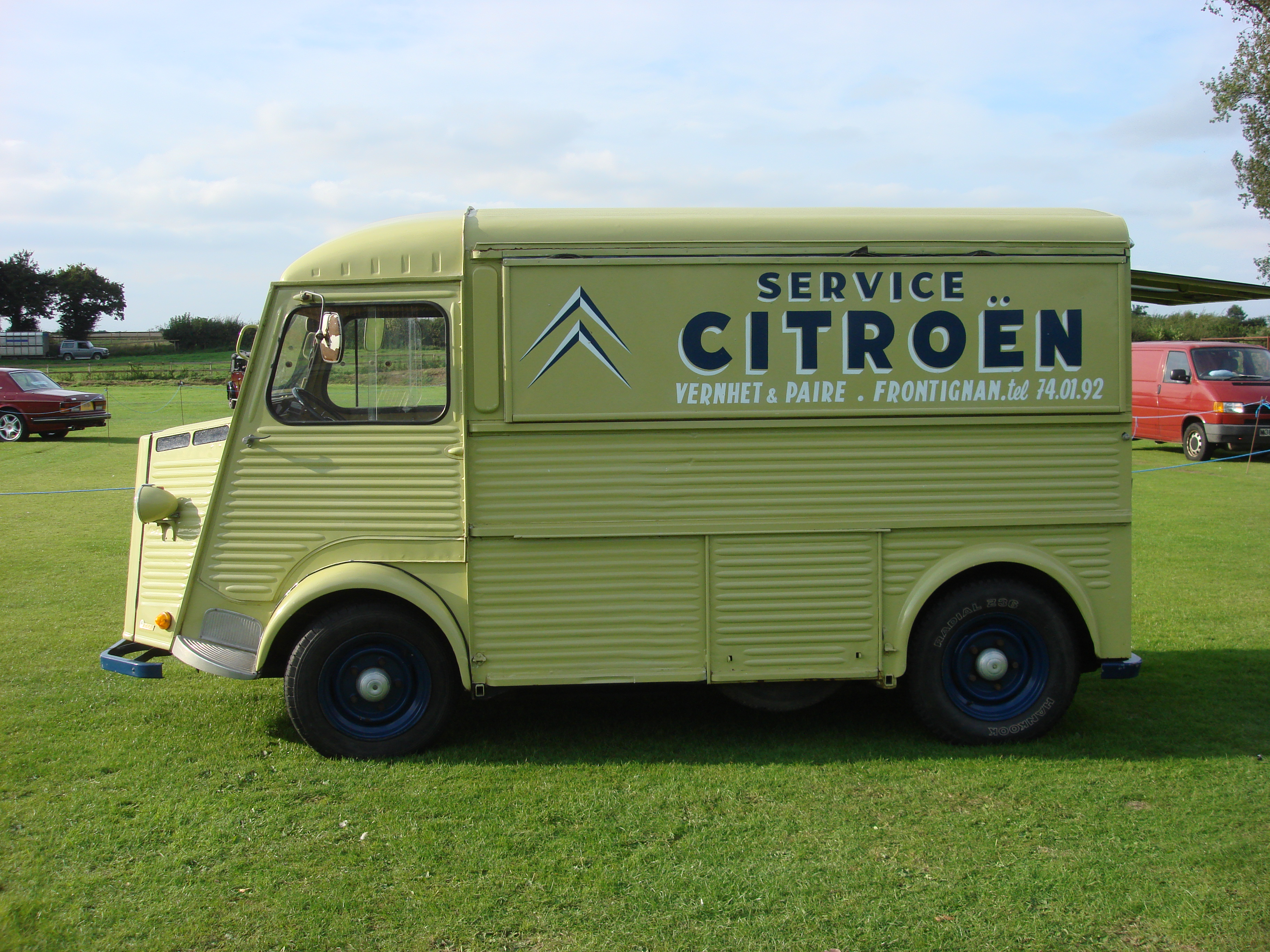
Left side view: pre-1969 model with semi-circular rear wings and suicide doors

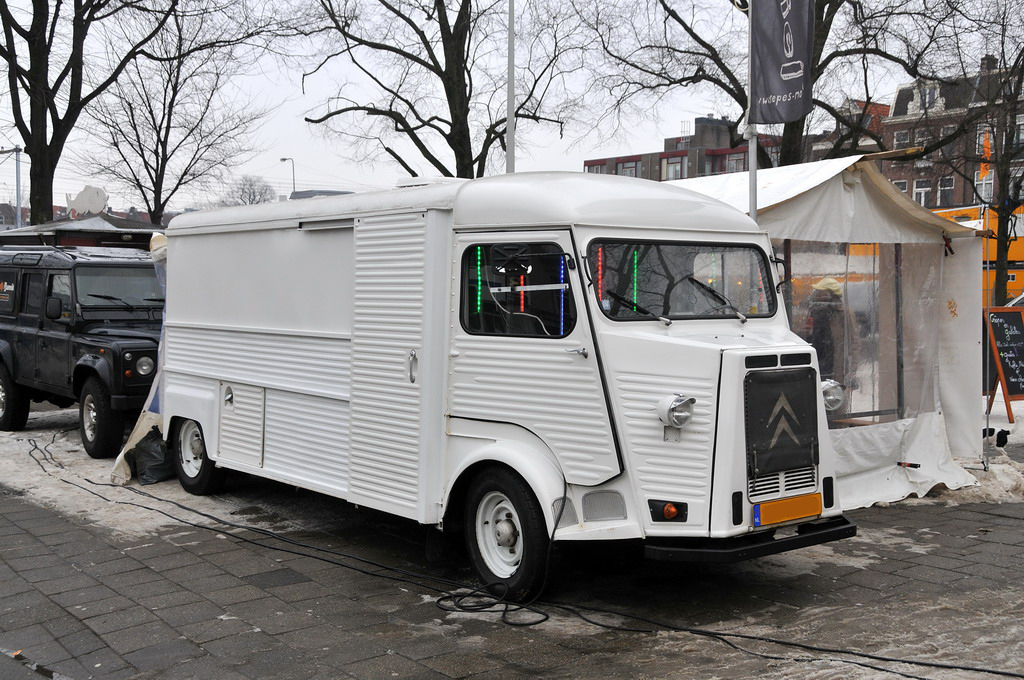
Citroën HY Long Wheel Base

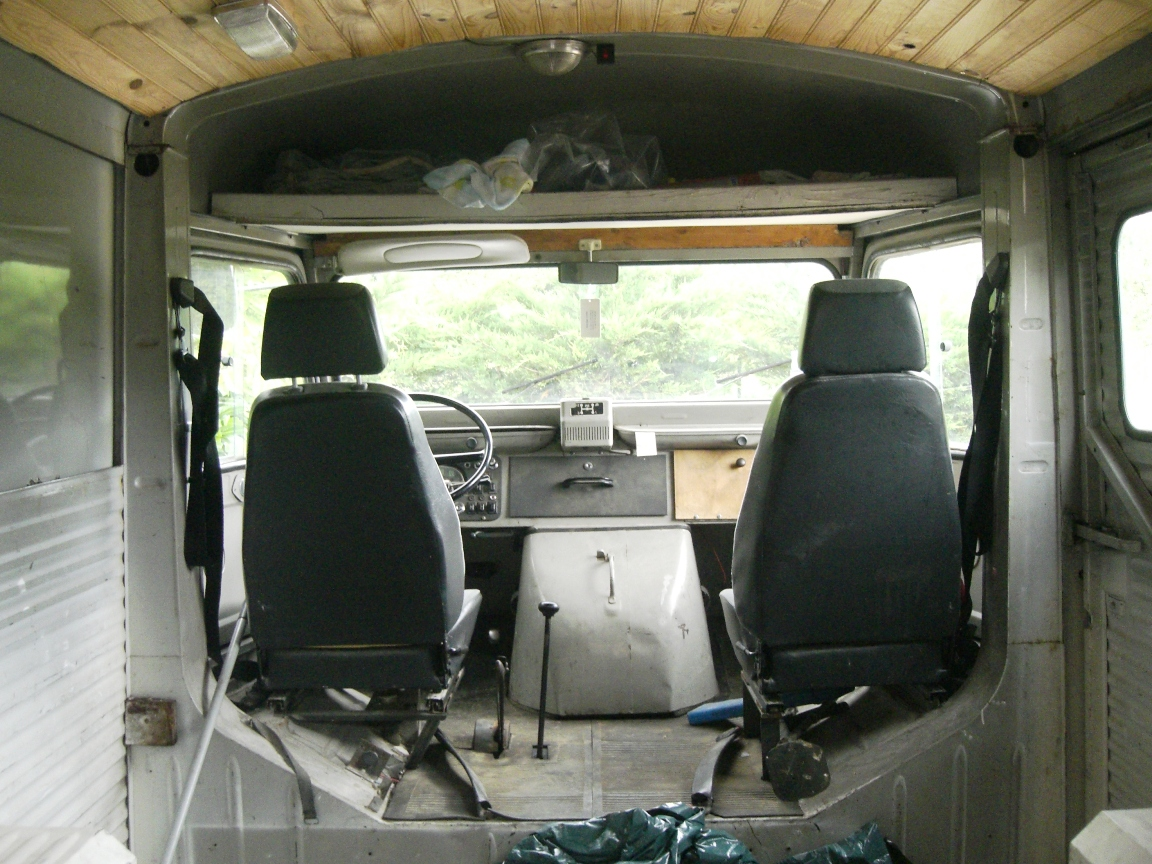
Citroën HY Interior

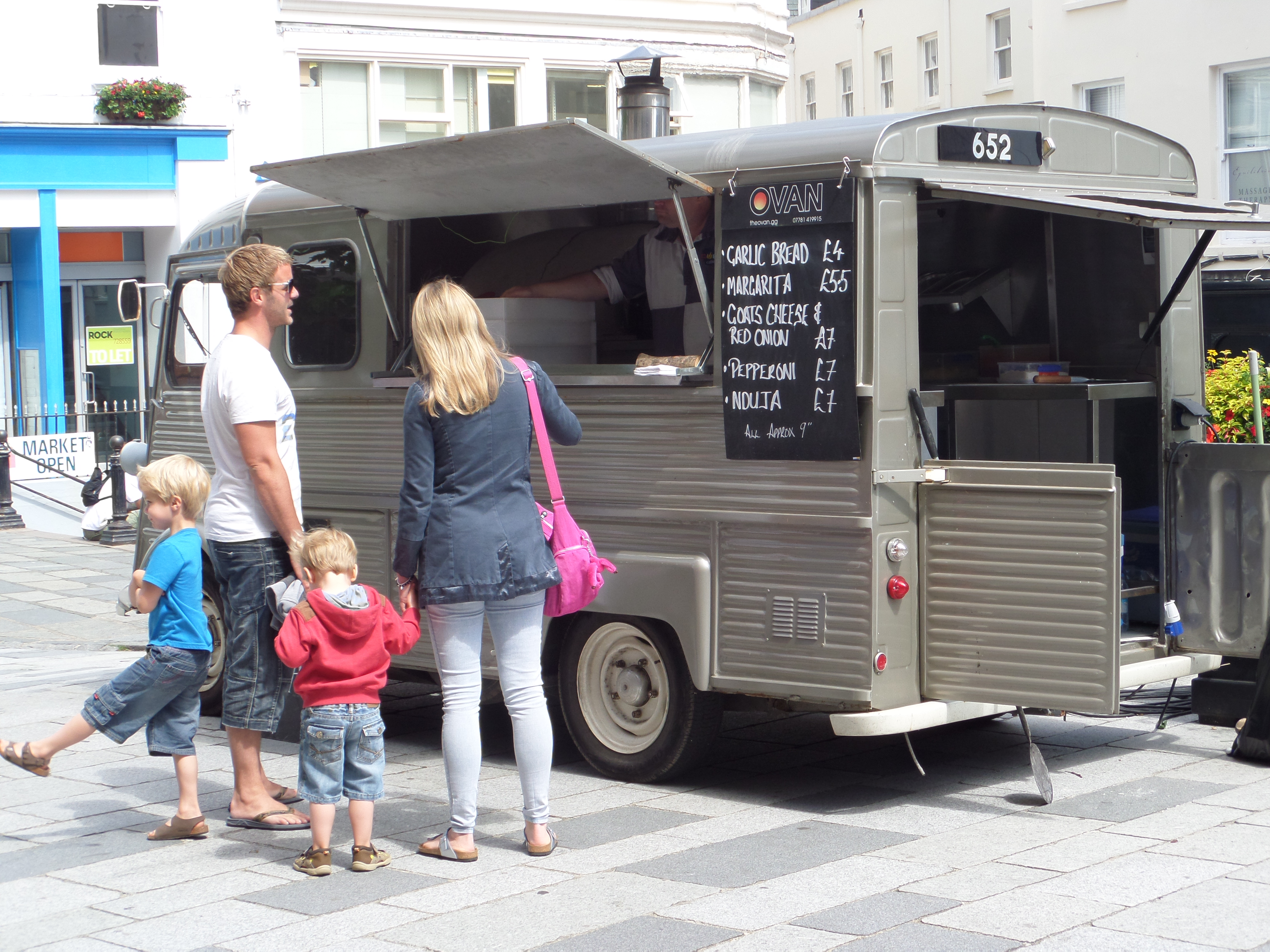
Tailgate opens in three sections (2014).

The Citroën H-Type vans (most commonly the Citroën HY), are a series of panel vans and light trucks, produced by French automaker Citroën for 34 years – from 1947 through 1981. They are notable for their industrial design, using many corrugated metal outer body panels to save material, weight, and costs. Early models of the uniquely styled trucks were just named Type H, but soon they were differentiated by a second letter, using the last four letters in the alphabet – except for the type HP for (flat-bed) pickups. Thus the vans were built as the types HW through HZ – with the majority of them built as Citroën HY.

The Citroën H-types were developed as simple, low-cost, front-wheel drive vans after World War II, using the same design philosophy as on Citroën's 2CV, but featuring a frameless, unitary body-structure. A total of 473,289 of their variants were produced in 34 years in factories in France and Belgium.

== Design ==
Like the 1934 Citroën Traction Avant, the H had a unitary body with no separate frame, front independent suspension, and front-wheel drive. For a commercial van, this combination provided unique benefits: a flat floor very close to the ground, and 6 ft (180 cm) standing height. Loading is by a combination of an upward-hinged tailgate with lower double half-doors at the rear, and optionally a sliding door on the side. There were short- and long-wheelbase models, and choice of short or longer rear overhang. The sides of the vans got varying treatments.

The distinctive corrugated bodywork used throughout the period of production was inspired by German Junkers (Aircraft) who used this technique starting during the First World War until the 1930s, the three-engined Junkers Ju 52 being the last to use this construction. Henry Ford adopted the same type of construction for the Ford Tri-Motor passenger aircraft. The ribs added strength without adding weight, and required only simple, low-cost press tools. The flat body panels were braced on the inside by 'top hat' box sections, installed at right angles to the ribs. The welded floor was strong enough to support a horse.

== Marketing ==
Most H Vans were sold in France, Belgium and the Netherlands. At the Slough Trading Estate assembly facility (1926–1966), Citroën UK built a very small number of right-hand-drive versions. The German market, however, was supplied by key competitors: the direct rival Volkswagen Type 2, and the also-front-drive DKW Schnellaster minivan.

As with the Volkswagen, the H Van could not be competitive in the US after 1964, due to the Chicken tax, a 25-percent tariff on commercial vehicles.

== Mechanical ==
The engine, gearbox and many smaller parts are shared with other Citroën models. The engine and gearbox are nearly identical to those in the Traction Avant and later the DS, only mounted with the engine in front of the gearbox. The headlights were identical to those of the 2CV, while speedometers were successively borrowed from the Traction Avant and the Ami 6.

While the derated "Traction Avant" four-cylinder engine and the unsophisticated three-speed gearbox (non-synchromesh on first gear) offered only a modest top speed of just under 100 km/h, the chassis and suspension layout provided good roadholding qualities for a van of the era, especially on the short-wheelbase version: low-slung chassis, with very little overhang, combined with sophisticated totally independent suspensions (the front using double torsion bars instead of conventional coil springs). With 35 hp (26 kW), the downtuned 1.9-litre 11D engine in the initial, cast-iron-head variant offered more usable power than the 1.2-litre engine of its competitor, the 1950 Volkswagen Type 2.

Period brochures sometimes refer to the 11D engine producing 50 hp (37 kW); many sources indicate that power increased gradually throughout the 1950s as the quality of petrol and raw materials improved. In late 1963, the 1.9-liter, 11CV engine was replaced with a downsleeved version with an alloy, crossflow head. The bore was reduced from 78 to 72 mm (3.1 to 2.8 in) and it was accordingly called the type 72. The new engine produced 45 hp SAE (33 kW) at 4,200 rpm, which allowed for a higher top speed while also reducing the tax burden (down to 9CV) and improving fuel economy by 15–20 percent. The 1.9-litre engine reappeared in late 1966 for the HY 78 and HZ 78; now with the same alloy head as the type 72 it had 58 hp (43 kW) at 4,200 rpm.

Diesel engines were also available, initially from Perkins beginning in 1961. This was replaced by the Indenor engine in March 1964. The Perkins 4/99 engine in the HYDI and HZDI produces 42 hp (31 kW); this increased to 50 hp (37 kW) when the 1.8-litre Indenor TMD replaced it in 1964. In December 1966, the Indenor diesel was given a larger bore, increasing displacement to 1.95 litres and power to 57 hp (42 kW).

== Styling changes ==
The basic design changed very little from 1947 to 1981.

Vehicles left the Citroën factory with only three body styles: the standard enclosed van, a pick-up version, and a stripped-down body which went to non-Citroën coach builders and formed the basis for the cattle truck and other variants. The basic version had an overall length of 4.26 metres (14 ft 0 in), but vehicles were also available in a long-wheelbase version with an overall length of 5.24 metres (17 ft 2 in).

In September 1963 the earlier style rear window – a narrow vertical window with curved corners – was replaced with a square window the same height but wider, 45 cm (18 in) on each side. The bonnet was modified to give two additional rectangular air intakes at the lower edges, one for a heater, the other a dummy for symmetry.

In early 1964, the split windscreen used since 1947 was replaced with a single windscreen, while in late 1964 the chevrons on the radiator grille, previously narrow aluminum strips similar to those on the Traction Avant, were replaced with the shorter, pointed style of chevrons as used on most Citroën vehicles in the last decades of the twentieth century.

In November 1969 the small parking lights were discontinued, the front indicators were recessed into the wings, and the shape of the rear wings was changed from semi-circular to rectangular.

Rear hinged 'suicide' cab doors were used until the end of production in 1981, except on vehicles manufactured for the Dutch market where conventionally hinged doors were available from 1968.

== Names ==
Citroën's teams worked on eight projects and only the last one was developed, giving it its name, H. Most Type H vans were sold as model HY. Other models include H (early versions), HX (lesser load capacity), HP (flat-bed pick-up), HZ, and HW (greater load capacity). For a time they were also sold as model 1600. When used by the police, it was called "panier à salade" ("salad basket").

== Legacy ==
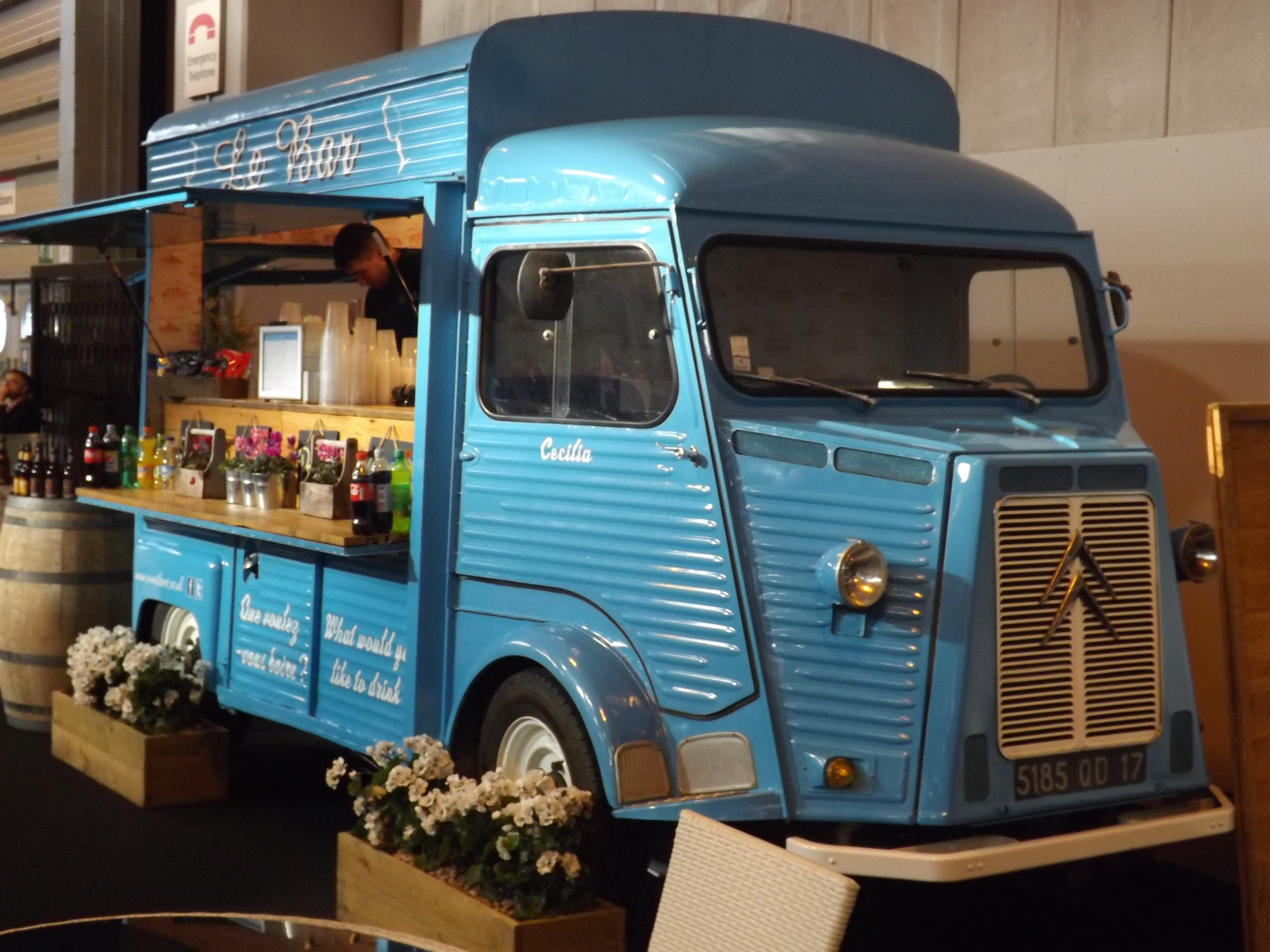
Type H used as a food truck

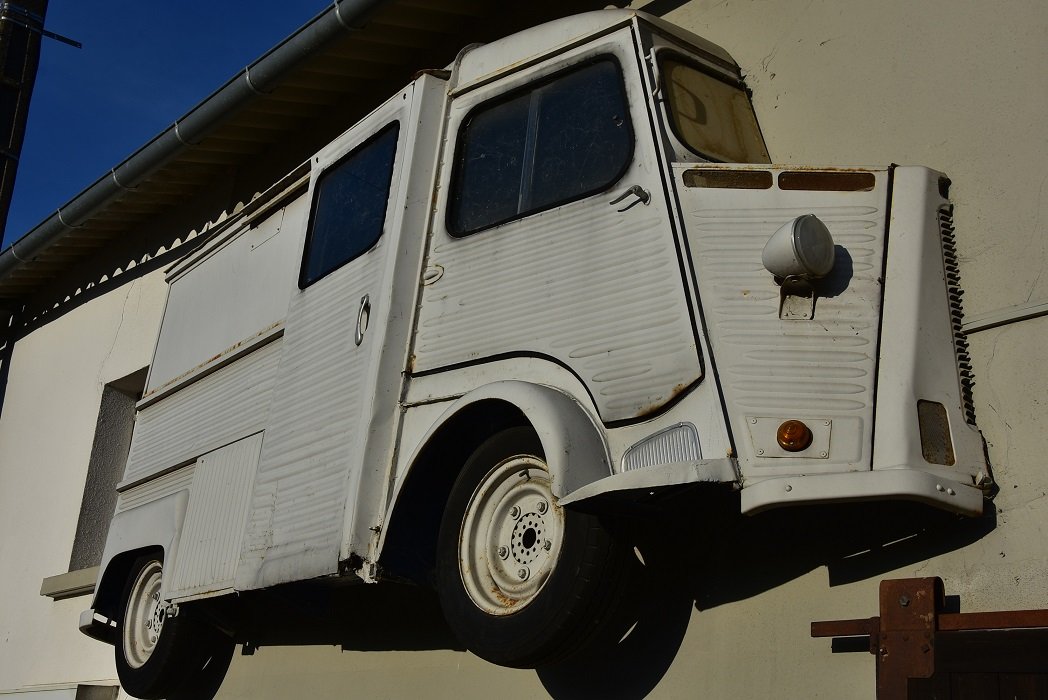
Used as a true embossed ad, on the facade of an antique shop

Vintage H vans are still a common sight in Europe and in cosmopolitan cities around the world, serving as stylish food trucks evoking a retro continental image. Vintage versions are available as non-operating static displays or upgraded with modern engines and power steering.

Italian coachbuilder Fabrizio Caselani of FC Automobili has resurrected the classic design in honor of the H van's 70th anniversary in 2017, and produces a body kit based on the modern Fiat Ducato/Citroën Jumper/Ram ProMaster X290 platform, and a smaller HG version based on the Citroën Jumpy PSA EMP2 platform, both under license from Citroën.
