= Citroën Berlingo =

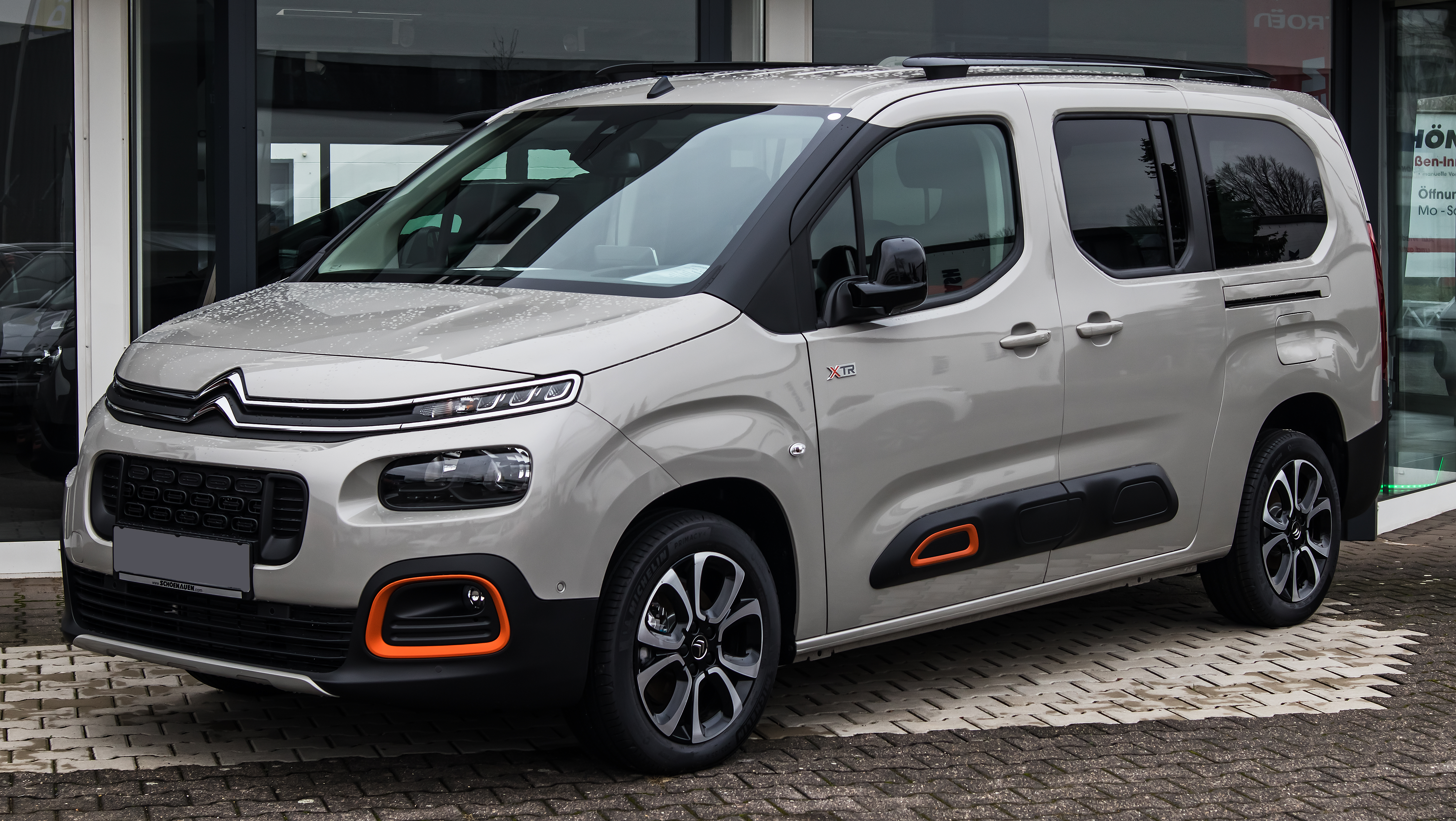
- 2020 Citroën Berlingo XL

Overview
- Manufacturer: PSA Group (1996–2021); Stellantis (2021–present)
- Production: 1996–present
- Assembly: France: Poissy (PSA Poissy Plant); Argentina: Villa Bosch (Sevel); Kazakhstan: Kostanay (Saryarka AvtoProm); Morocco: Casablanca (Somaca Casablanca Plant); Poland: Nysa (FSO); Portugal: Mangualde (PSA Mangualde Plant); Russia: Kaluga (PCMA Rus); Spain: Vigo (PSA Vigo Plant); Uruguay: Barra de Carrasco (Oferol, Grand Berlingo)

Body and chassis
- Class: Commercial vehicle
- Body style: 4/5-door panel van 5-door multi-purpose vehicle 2-door pickup truck (Partner II)
- Layout: Front-engine, front-wheel-drive

Chronology
- Predecessor: Citroën C15; Peugeot 205 Panel Van; Peugeot 305 Panel Van; Opel/Vauxhall Combo

The Citroën Berlingo and Peugeot Partner are a range of minivans produced since 1996 and marketed under the Citroën and Peugeot marque. They are sold as light commercial vehicles or as a passenger multi-purpose-vehicle variant with rear seats and windows. They were a product of the French PSA Group before it became part of Stellantis in 2021. The third generation is sold under the Opel and Vauxhall marques as the Combo, by Toyota as the Proace City since 2019, and by Fiat as the Doblò since 2022.

The panel vans are available in passenger versions named the Berlingo Multispace and Partner Combi, Partner Tepee, and Peugeot Rifter for the third generation. In Italy, the first generation of the Partner was known as the Peugeot Rancher.

They were initially based on the Citroën ZX/Peugeot 306 estate floorpan and mechanicals. Today they use the EMP2 platform front-end while retaining the rear end of the previous version.

With their rectangular, box-like cargo space and aerodynamic front, conceptually they can arguably be considered the descendants of the Citroën 2CV panel van (AK400).

Both the Berlingo and Partner have been produced in CNG and electric versions and with four-cylinder petrol and diesel engines.

== First generation (M49; 1996) ==
First generation
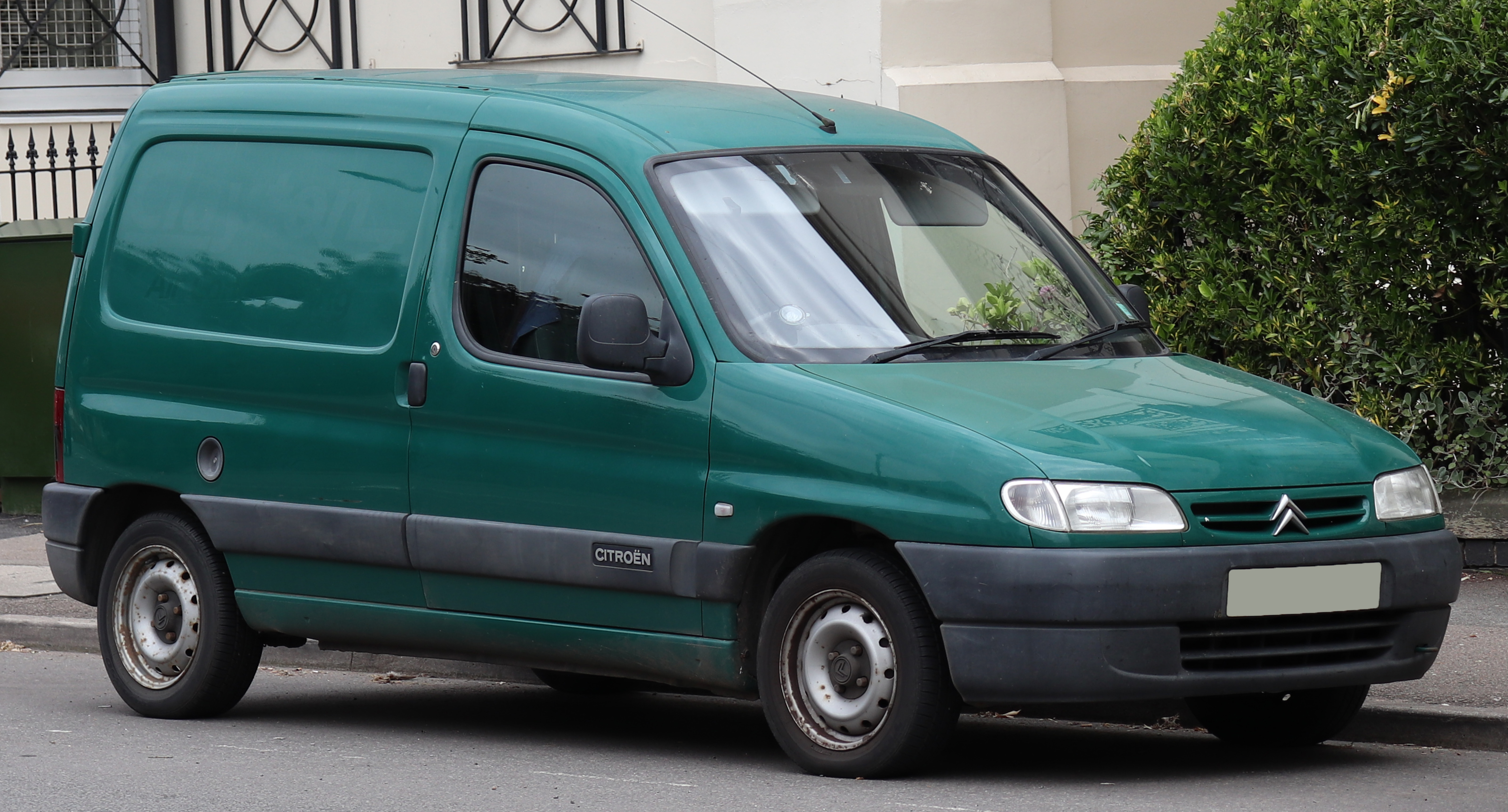

Overview
- Also called: Peugeot Partner; Peugeot Grand Raid (Mexico); Peugeot Ranch (Italy); Doninvest Orion M (Russia)
- Production: 1996–2008 (Original versions, including Multispace); 2008–2013 (Peugeot Partner Origin, and Citroën Berlingo First); 1998–2026 (Argentina)

Body and chassis
- Body style: 4/5-door panel van 5-door passenger van

Powertrain
- Engine: Petrol: 1.4 L TU3 I4; 1.6 L TU5 I4; 1.8 L XU7 JB / LFX I4; Diesel: 1.6 L Ford of Europe/PSA joint venture DV6 I4 HDi Common rail direct injection turbo diesel 1.9 L DW8 I4; 2.0 L DW10 HDi Common rail direct injection turbo diesel
- Electric motor: 28 kW Leroy Somer Permanent Magnet Synchronous Motor (Berlingo Electrique)
- Transmission: 5-speed manual
- Battery: 162 V Saft NiCd battery

Dimensions
- Wheelbase: 2,695 mm (106.1 in)
- Length: 4,135 mm (162.8 in)
- Width: 1,820 mm (72 in)
- Height: 1,725 mm (67.9 in)

The Berlingo/Partner was officially launched in July 1996.

When the Berlingo was first shown at the Mondial de l'Automobile (Paris Motor Show) in 1996, a set of three concept cars was also presented:

- Berlingo Coupé de Plage
- Berlingo Berline Bulle
- Berlingo Grand Large

The Berline Bulle concept was a roomy small car, that could be considered as a precursor for the C3. Only one of these concepts was actually developed, the Grand Large version, which was developed into the Multispace and Combi people carriers/leisure vans.

Until 2010, the pre-facelift models were still produced in Argentina. The updated model finally arrived in 2010.

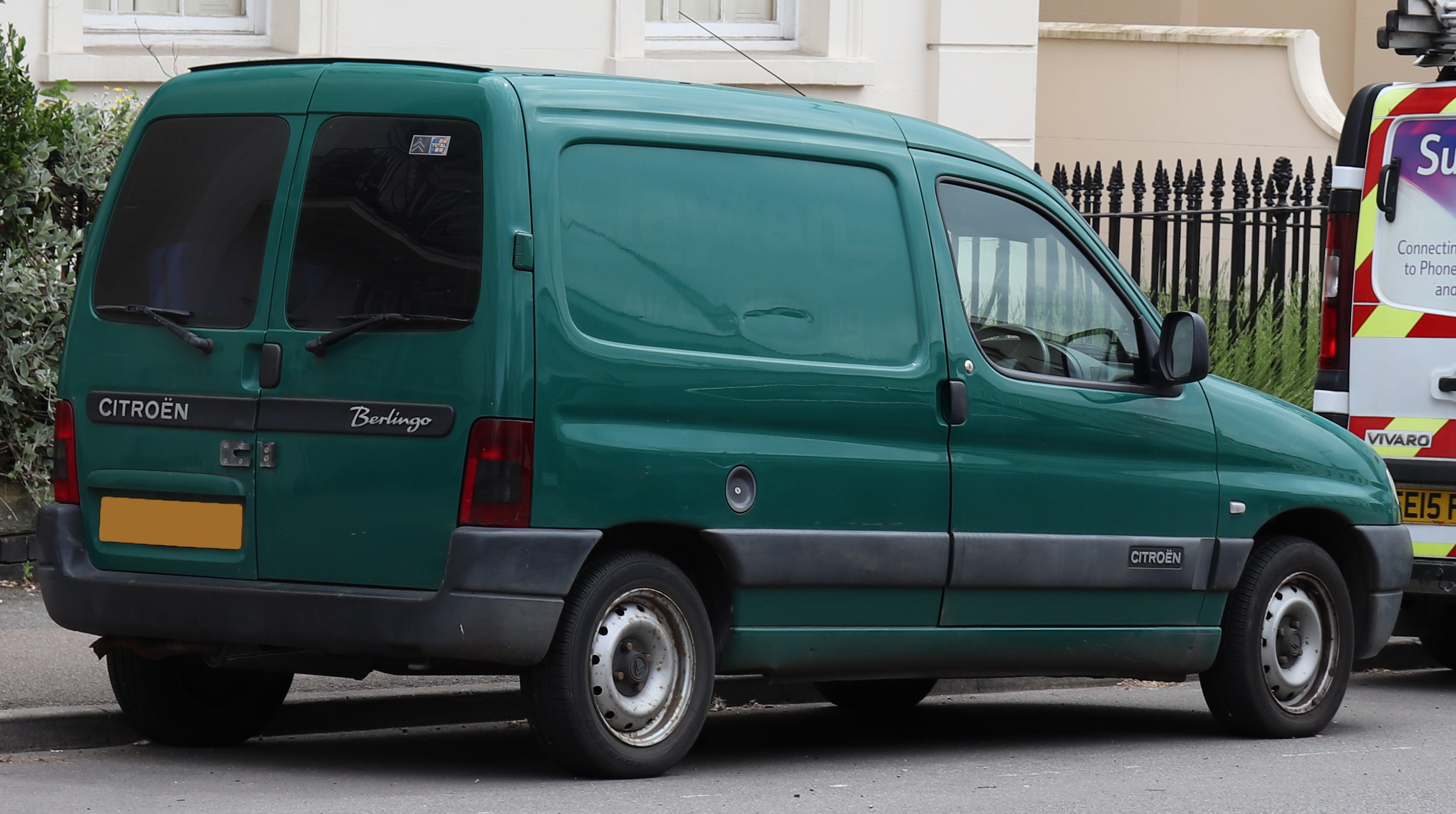
Pre-facelift Citroën Berlingo

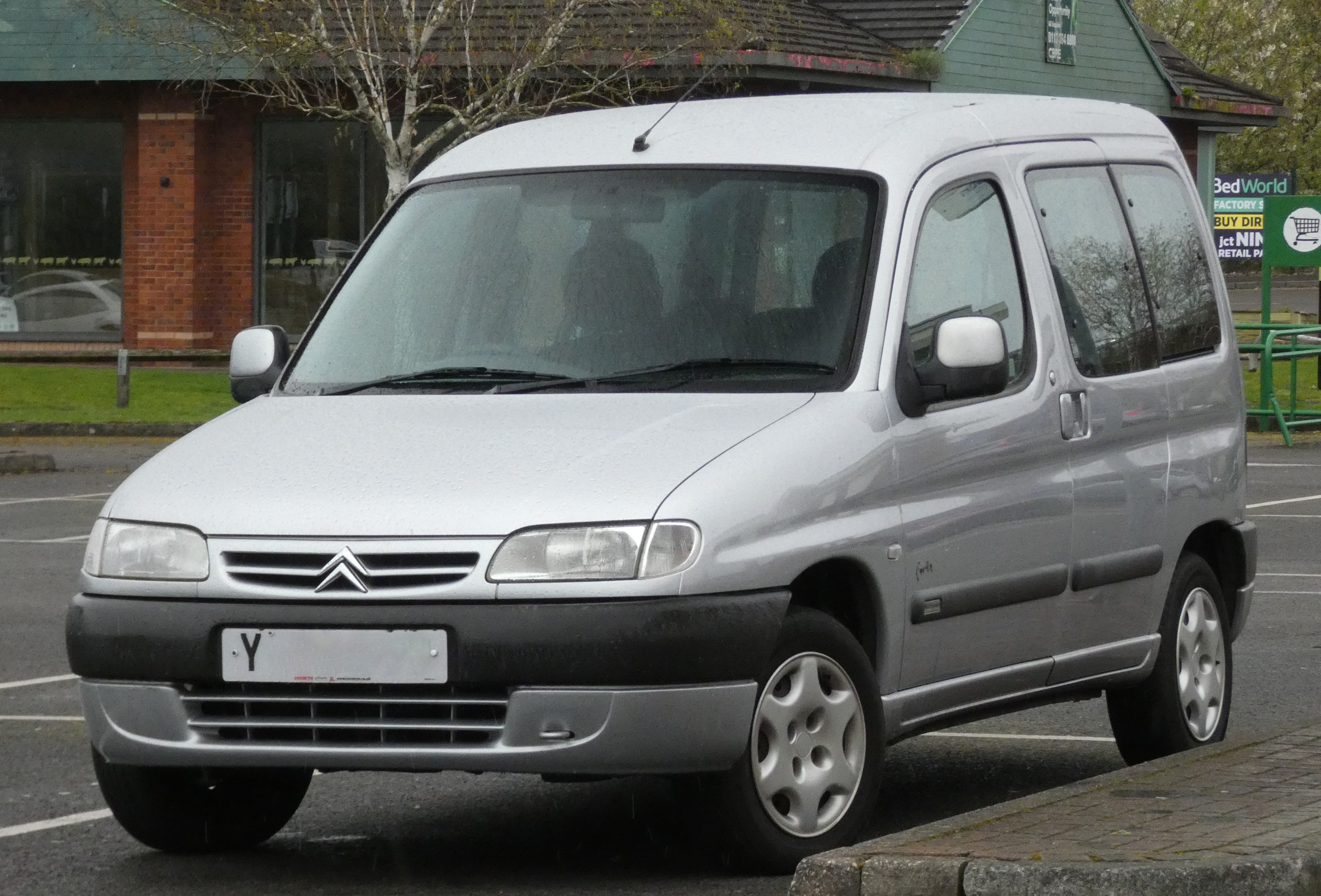
Pre-facelift Citroën Berlingo Multispace

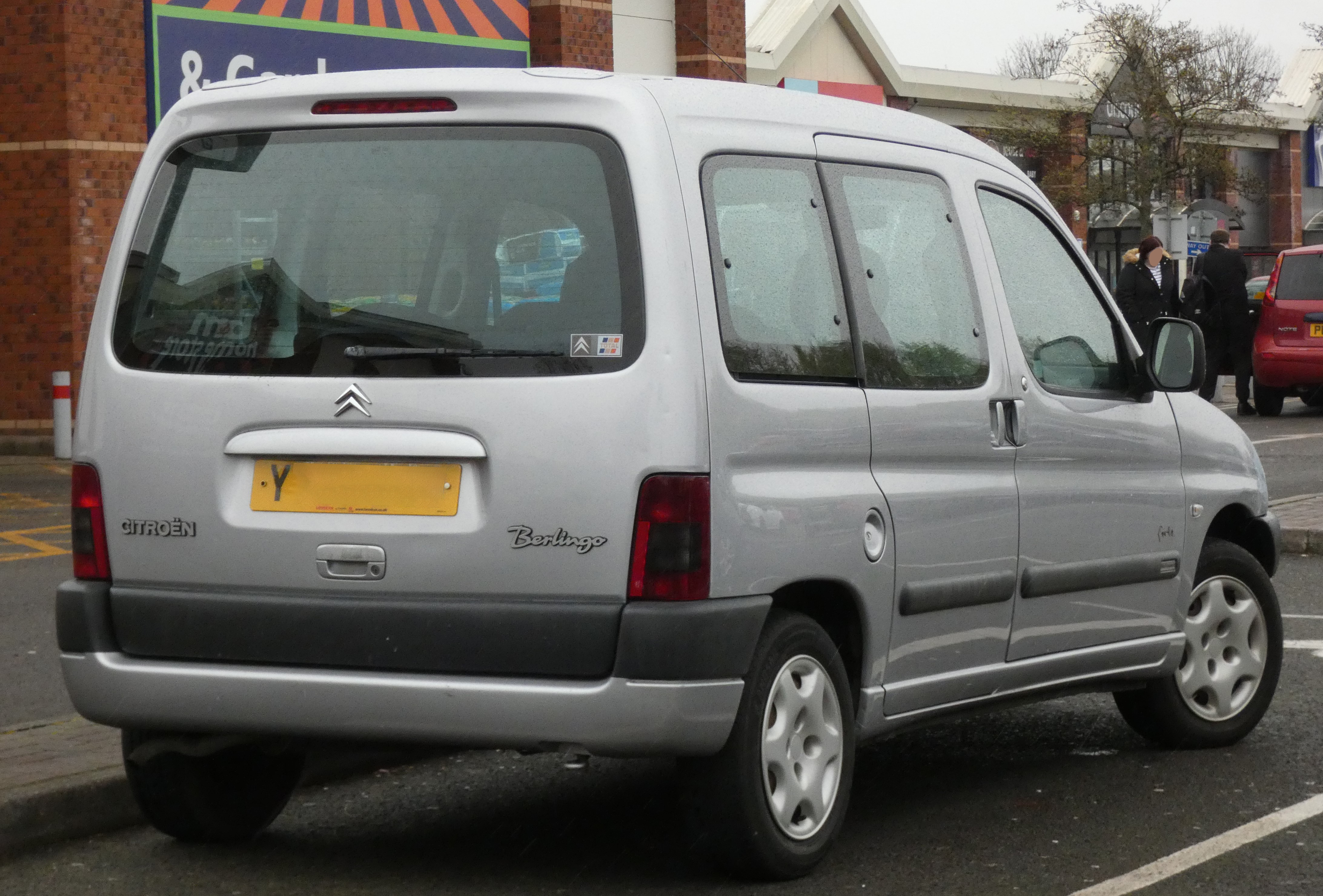
Pre-facelift Citroën Berlingo Multispace

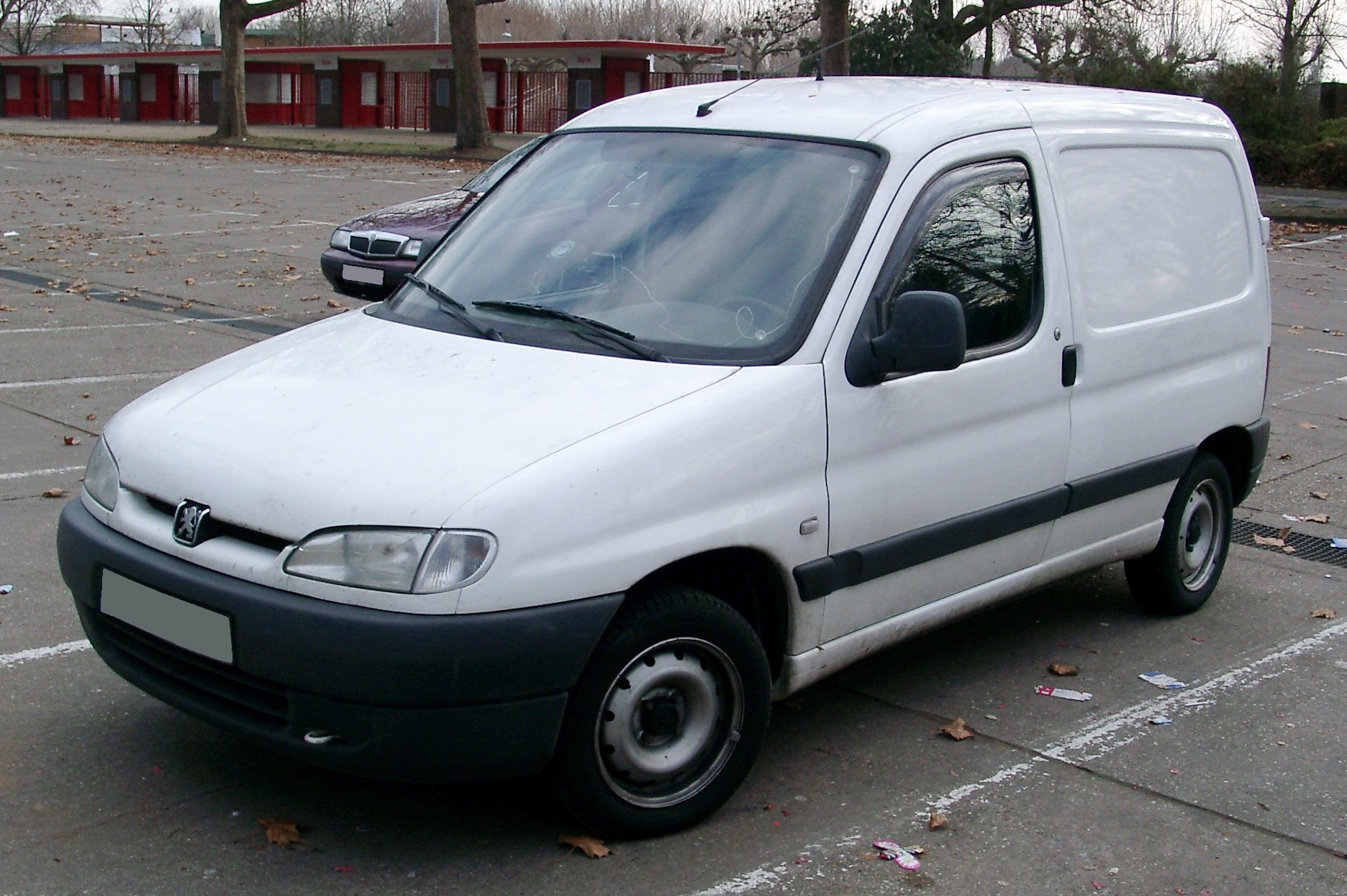
Pre-facelift Peugeot Partner van

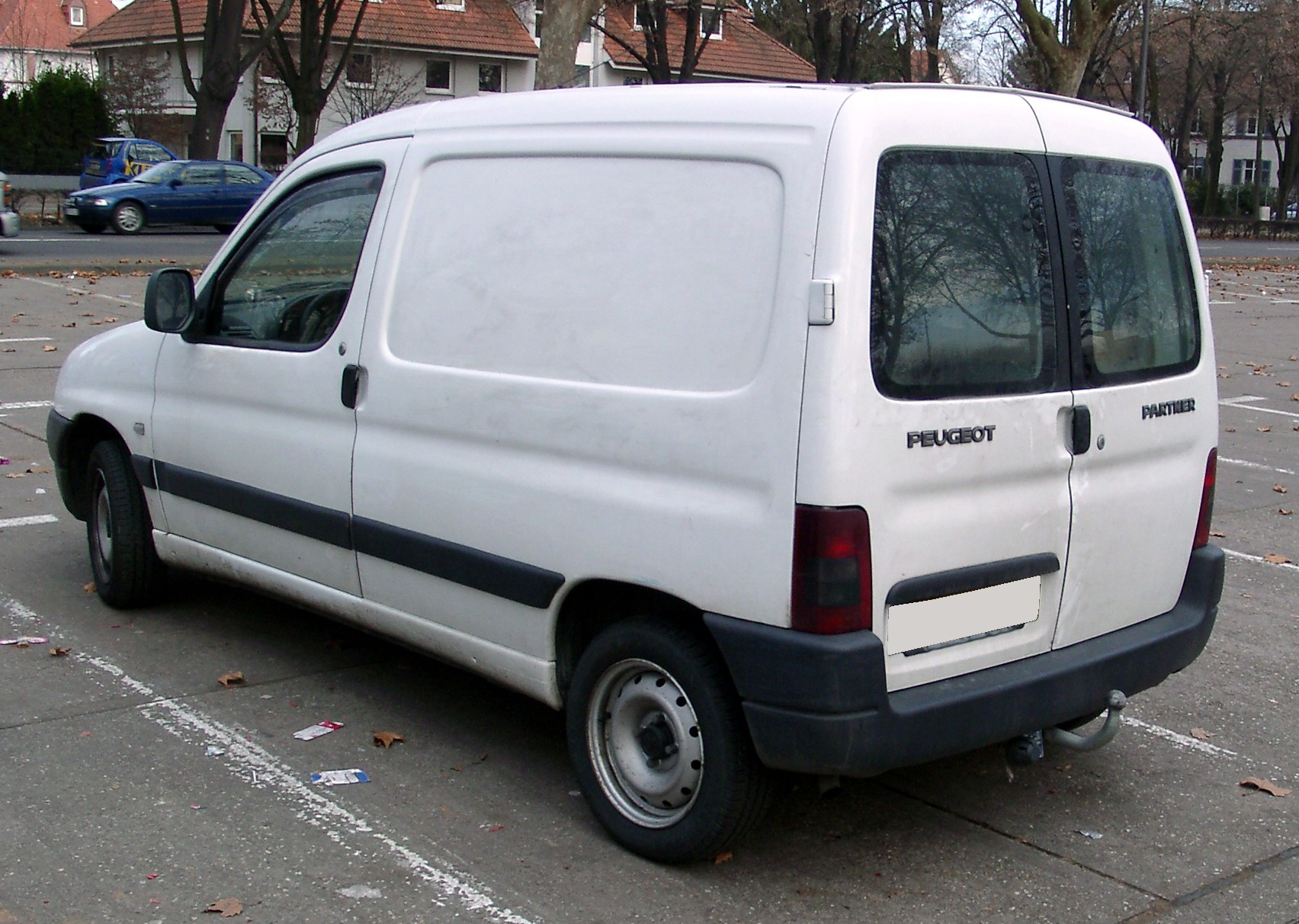
Pre-facelift Peugeot Partner van (Rear)

Doninvest Orion-M (Russia)

=== Facelift (M59; 2002) ===
A revised version, featuring a new instrument cluster, as seen in the Peugeot 206, redesigned interior and front end, was released in September 2002 (Berlingo I / Partner I).

During 2004, there was a minor facelift, including changes to the grille and light clusters.

After the launch of the second generation Berlingo and Rifter, the first generation models stayed offered. They took the names "Citroën Berlingo First" and "Peugeot Partner Origin".

In 2010, the Citroën Berlingo First Electrique and the Peugeot Partner Origin Electric were launched. These two electric vans were powered by the Monégasque firm Venturi, which assembled them in Solesmes, Sarthe.

In Argentina, Peugeot launched an off-road version of its Partner, called Partner Patagónica. This model had various names when it was sold across Europe in the 2000s, including Partner Ushuaïa Grand Raid, Partner Escapade, Partner Grande Escapade, Partner VTC, Partner Indiana, and others.

From 2013, the Berlingo and the Partner were discontinued in Europe. Both LCV and passenger versions continued their career in South America, where they were produced until 2026.

Passenger vans Berlingo Multispace and Partner Patagónica received an update in June 2021. More parts of both vehicles were manufactured locally. It means they now have barn doors (already manufactured locally for LCV Berlingo and Partner), replacing their tailgate that was imported from Europe.

The Berlingo and the Partner got a minor facelift in January 2023. The Berlingo adopted an updated Citroën logo (until there it still used the sharp logo from before 2009) and a new grille, in plastic. The Partner adopted the same grille and lost the piece of chrome around its front logo.

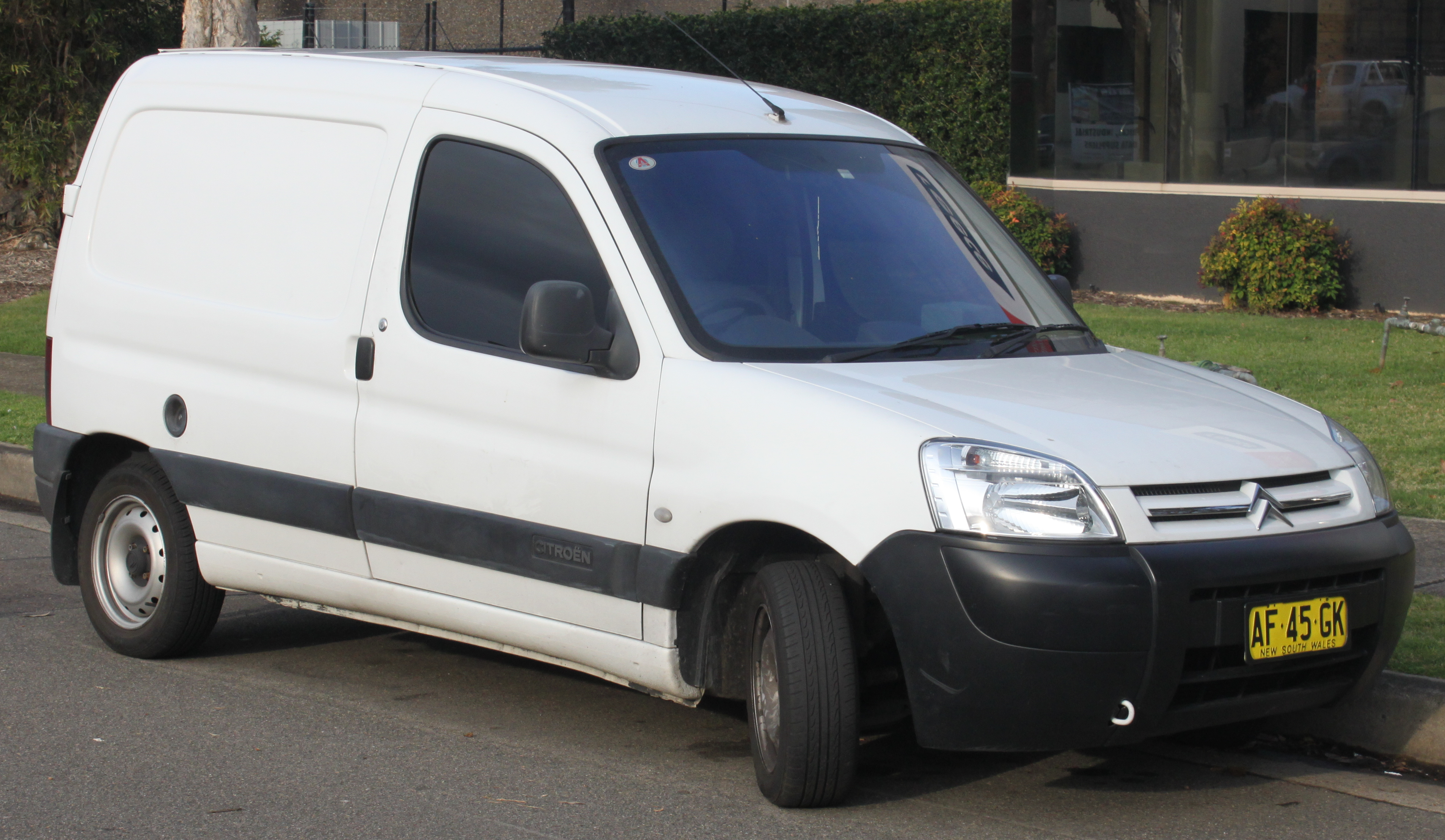
Facelifted Citroën Berlingo (2004–2012)

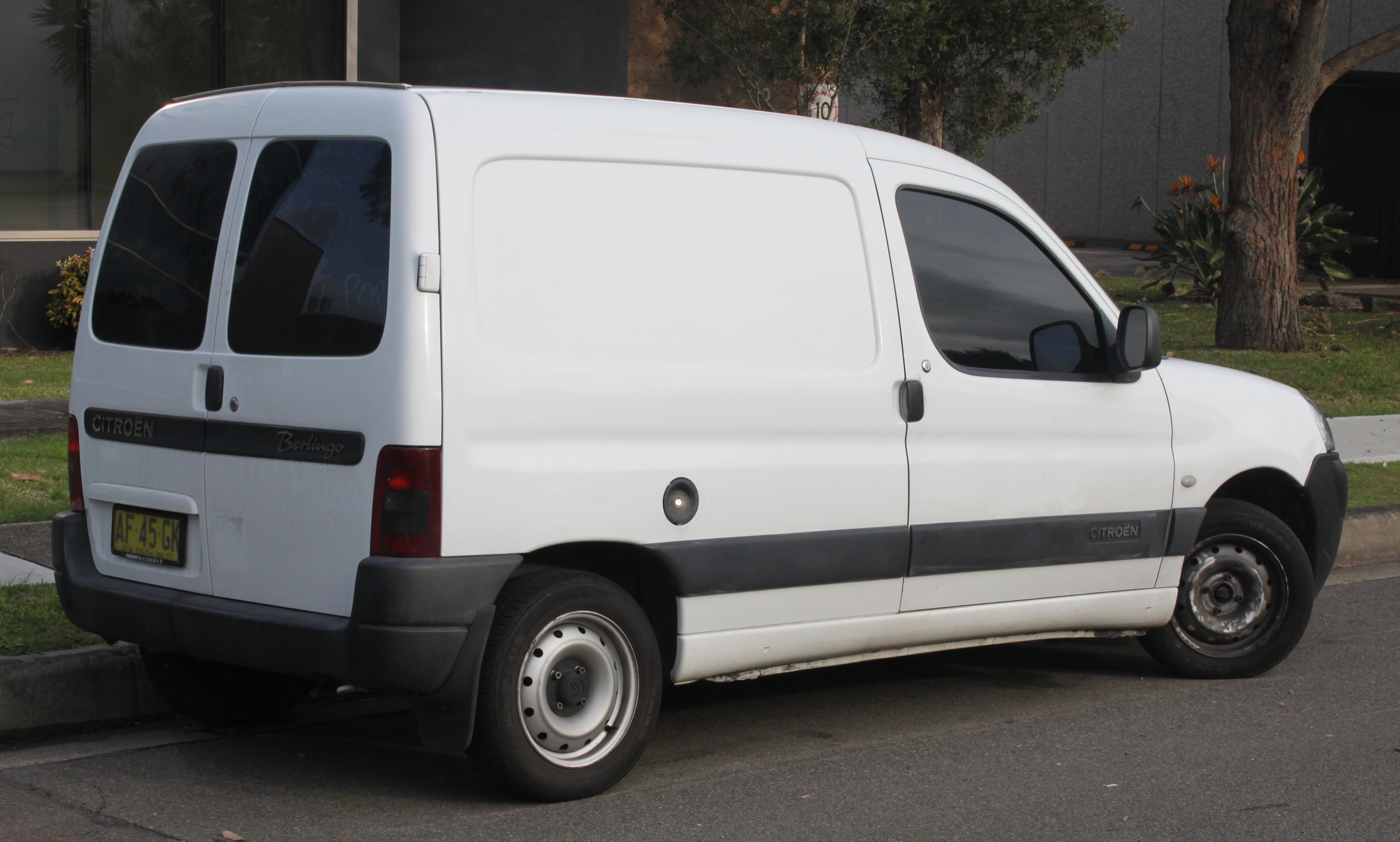
Facelifted Citroën Berlingo (2004–2012)

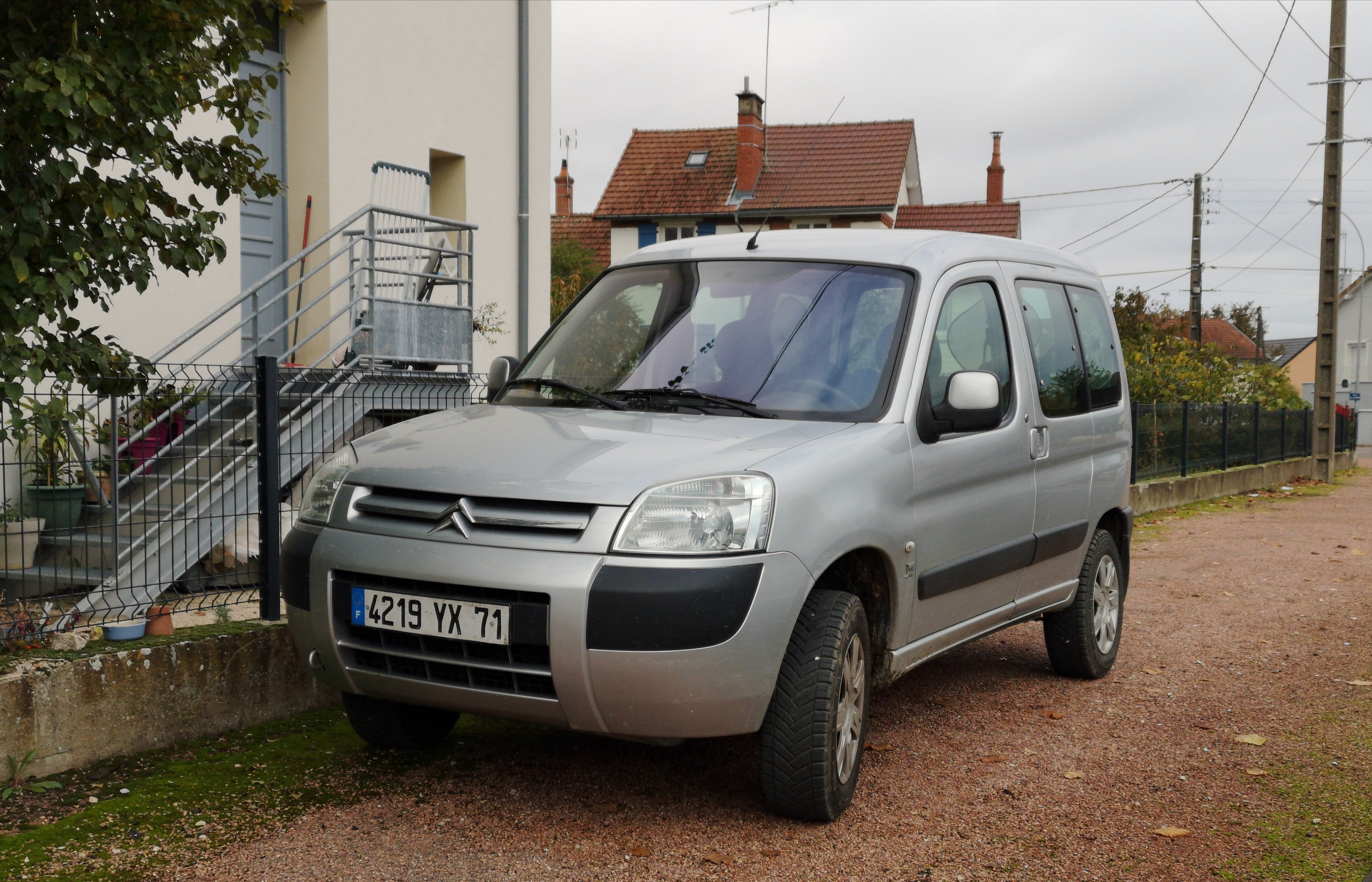
Citroën Berlingo Dangel (facelift, passenger model)

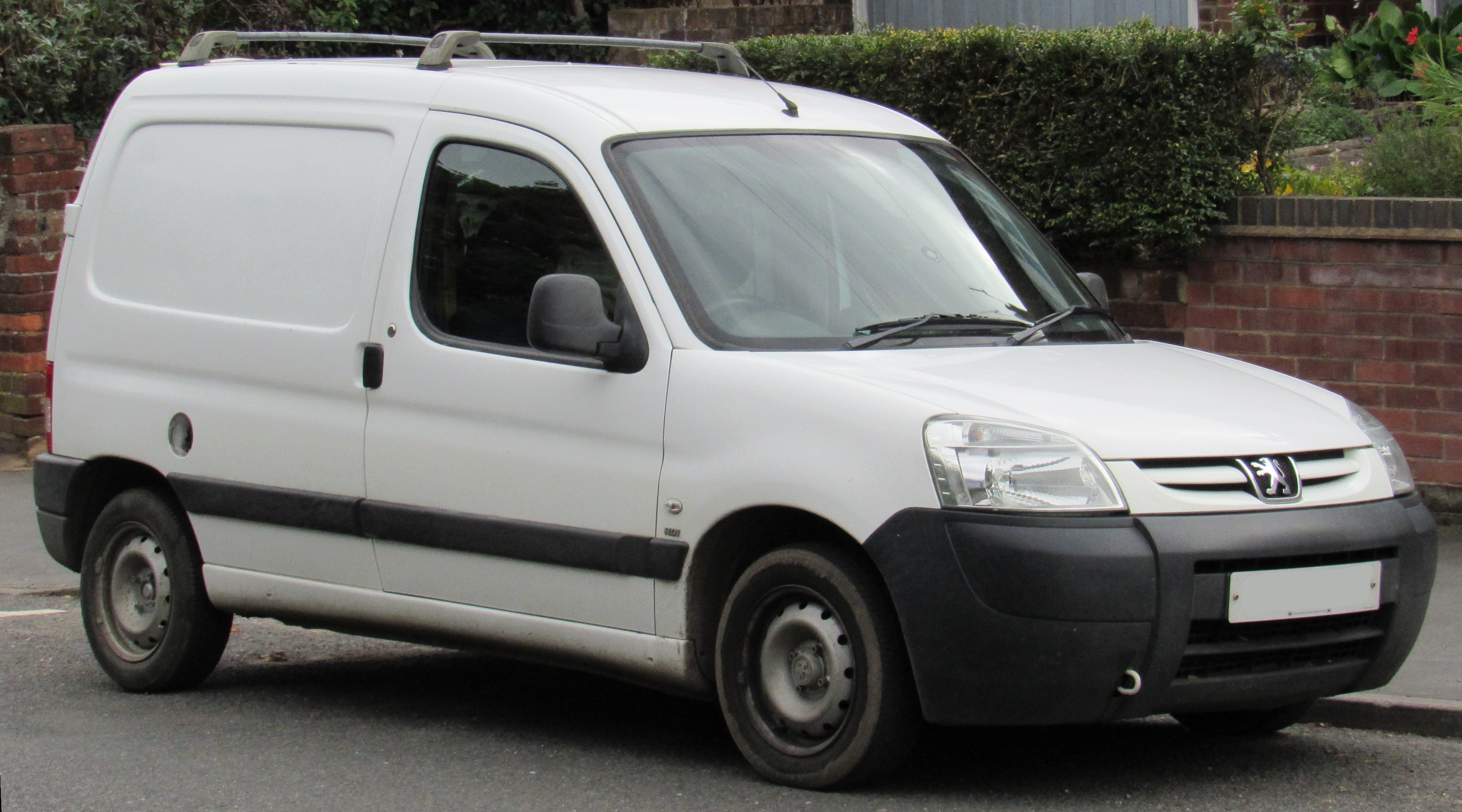
Facelifted Peugeot Partner (2004–2012)

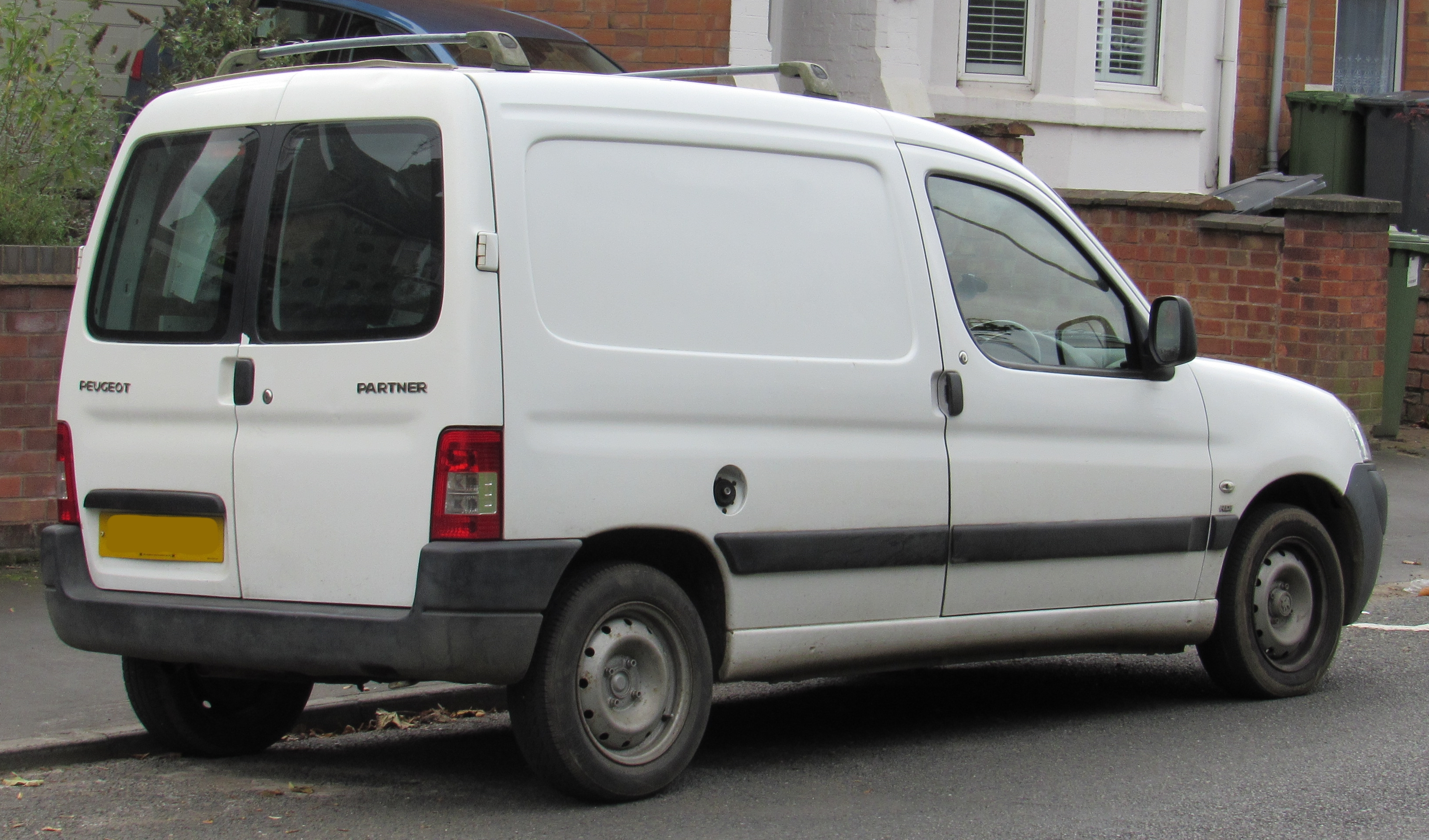
Facelifted Peugeot Partner (2004–2012)

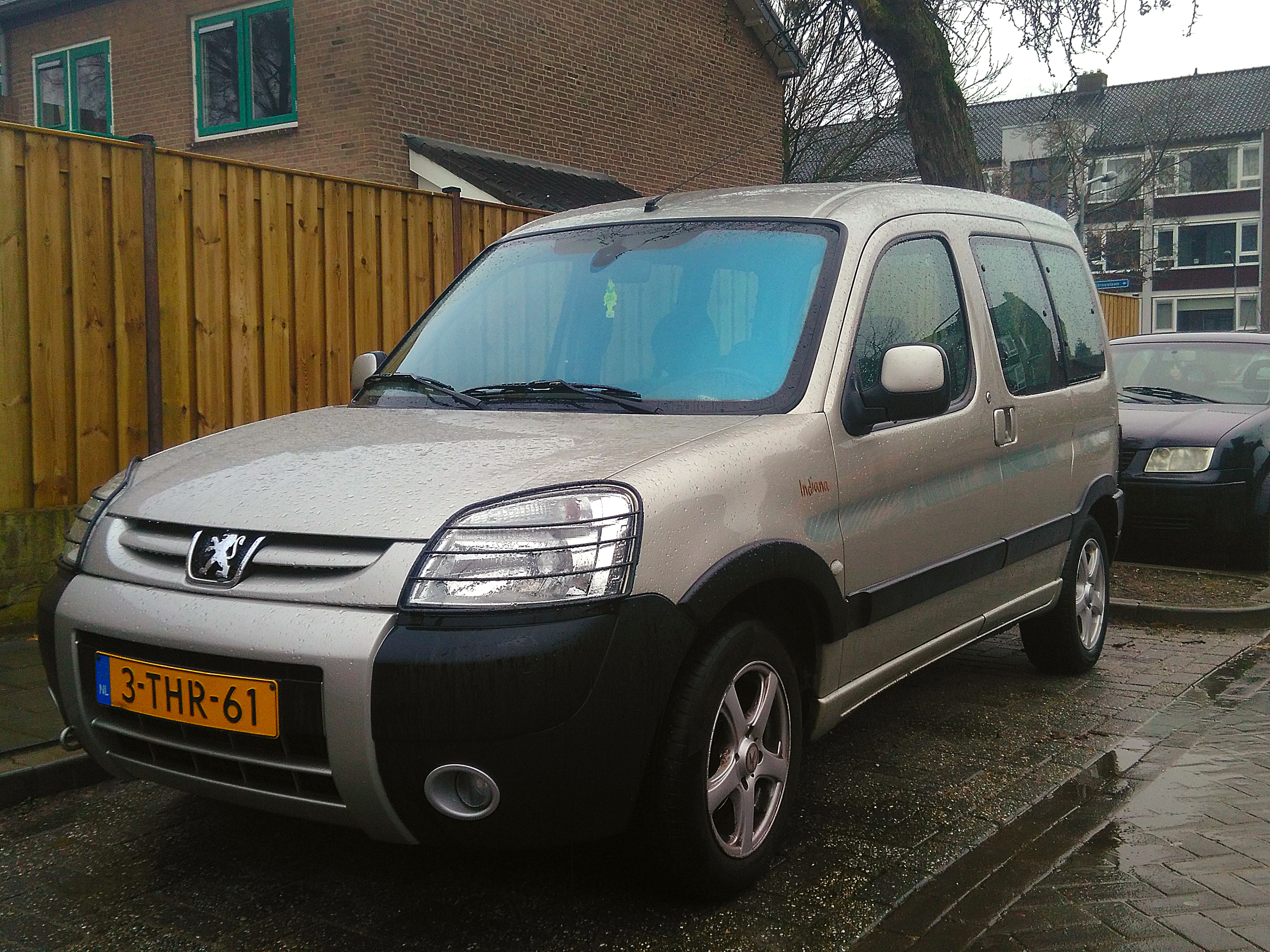
Peugeot Partner Indiana (facelift)

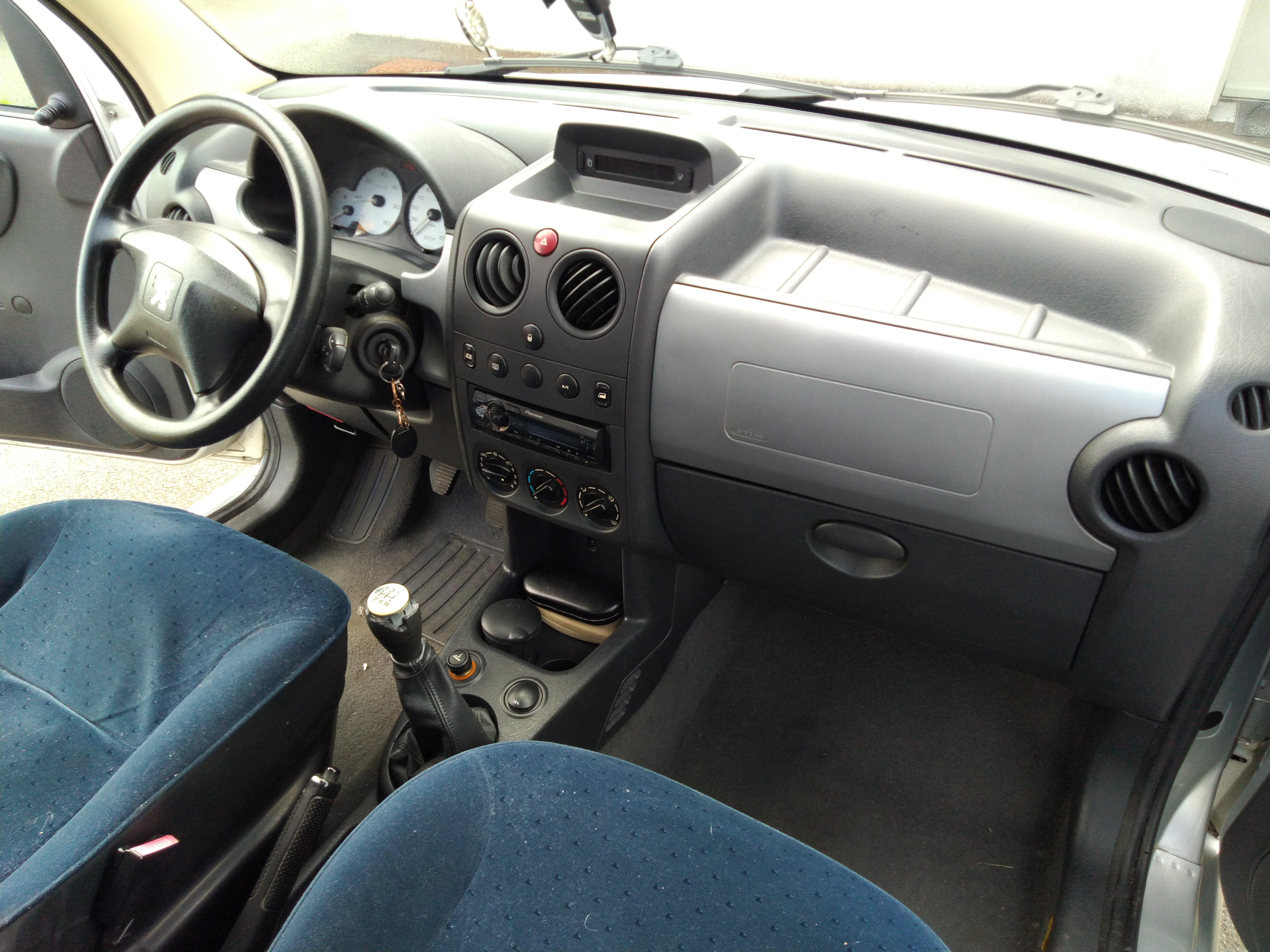
Interior

=== Engines ===
The vans were designed to be powered by petrol, diesel, electric, or CNG.

Capacity	Engine	Power	Torque
1.4 L (1360 cc)	TU3 I4	55 kW (75 PS; 74 hp)	121 N⋅m (89 lb⋅ft)
1.4 L GNV (1360 cc)	TU3 I4	55 kW (75 PS; 74 hp)	121 N⋅m (89 lb⋅ft) CNG/Gasoline
1.6 L (1560 cc)	DV6 HDi I4	55 kW (75 PS; 74 hp) – 68 kW (92 PS; 91 hp)	169 N⋅m (125 lb⋅ft) – 216 N⋅m (159 lb⋅ft)
1.6 L (1587 cc)	TU5 I4	80 kW (109 PS; 107 hp)	147 N⋅m (108 lb⋅ft)
1.8 L (1761 cc)	XU7 petrol injection I4	66 kW (90 PS; 89 hp)	147 N⋅m (108 lb⋅ft)
1.9 L (1905 cc)	XUD IDI diesel I4	52 kW (71 PS; 70 hp)	120 N⋅m (89 lb⋅ft)
1.9 L (1868 cc)	DW8 diesel I4	52 kW (71 PS; 70 hp)	127 N⋅m (94 lb⋅ft)
2.0 L (1997 cc)	DW10 HDi I4	66 kW (90 PS; 89 hp)	205 N⋅m (151 lb⋅ft)
N/A	Electrique	28 kW (38 PS; 38 hp)	180 N⋅m (133 lb⋅ft)

=== Electric version ===
The first-generation Berlingo was available first with a nickel-cadmium battery from 1998 to 2005. After that was discontinued, a small electric fleet was built for La Poste using the first-generation Berlingo chassis, equipped with a ZEBRA molten salt battery and a powertrain from Venturi Automobiles; this fleet was delivered in 2010.

A hybrid prototype was also developed in 1998 called the Berlingo Dynavolt. It utilized the Electrique base but had 23 nickel-cadmium batteries instead of the 28 in the Electrique to fit a LPG fueled, 500cc twin engine, made by Lombardini, to be used as a range extender to charge the batteries.

== Second generation (B9; 2008) ==
Second generation
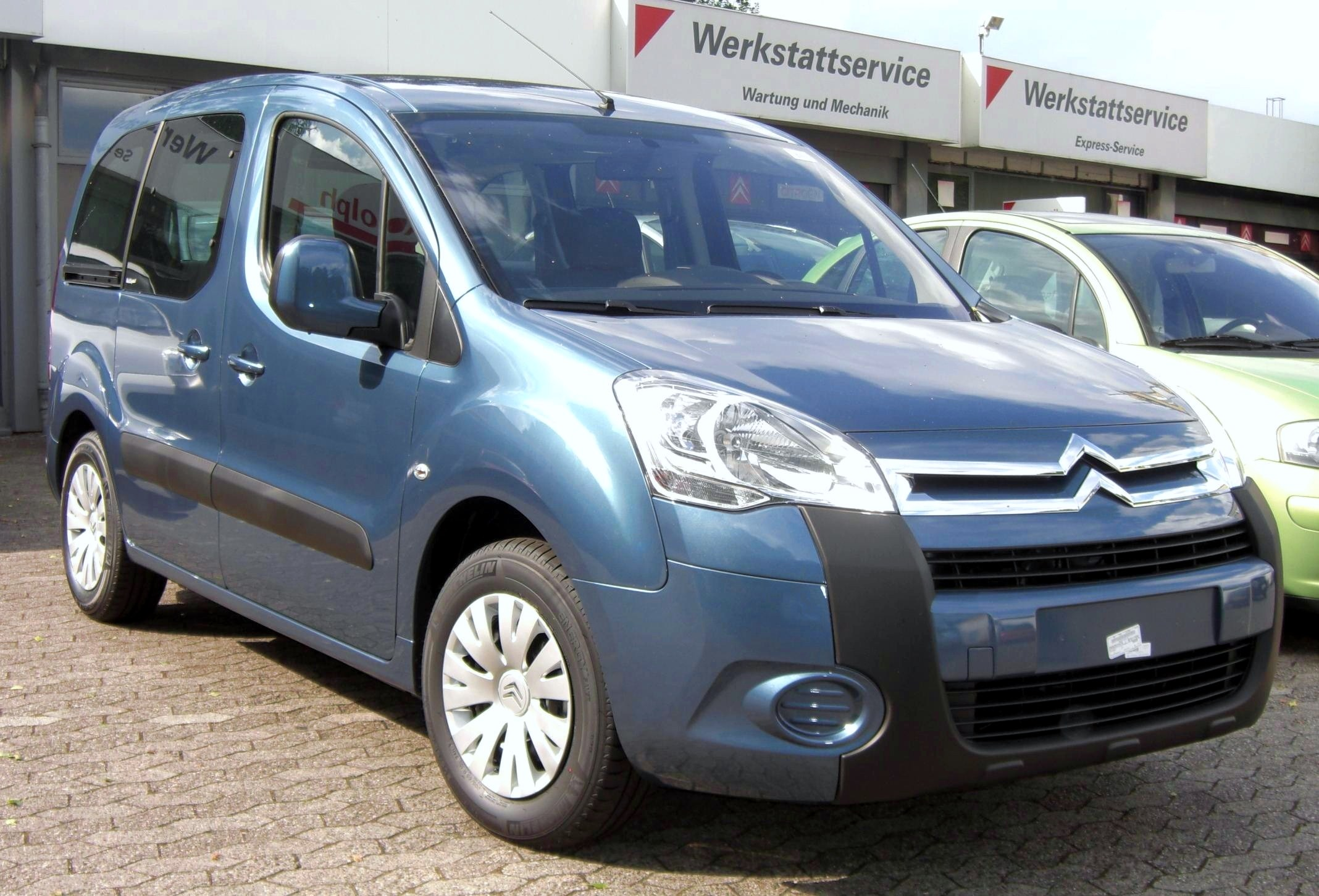

Overview
- Also called: Peugeot Partner; Opel Combo Cargo/Life (Russia)
- Production: 2008–2018; 2021–2022 (Russia)
- Designer: Gilles Vidal

Body and chassis
- Body style: 4/5-door panel van 5-door passenger van 2-door pickup truck (Partner)
- Platform: PSA PF2 platform
- Related: Peugeot 308; Peugeot 207

Powertrain
- Engine: Petrol: 1.6 L TU5 JP 16v I4; Diesel: 1.6 L DV6 HDi I4
- Electric motor: Permanent Magnet Synchronous Motor (Berlingo Electrique)
- Transmission: 5-speed manual 6-speed automated manual
- Battery: 22.5 kW-hr lithium-ion

Dimensions
- Wheelbase: 2,728–2,730 mm (107.4–107.5 in)
- Length: 4,379–4,628 mm (172.4–182.2 in)
- Width: 1,810–2,112 mm (71.3–83.1 in)
- Height: 1,805 mm (71.1 in)-1,840 mm (72 in)

Two different models replaced the first generation of the Peugeot Partner and Citroën Berlingo in 2008, a smaller vehicle (the Citroën Nemo/Peugeot Bipper, which also replaced recently discontinued Citroën C15 First) and larger (the Citroën Berlingo II/Peugeot Partner II).

The Berlingo II, styled by Gilles Vidal, used the PSA PF2 platform (like the Citroën C4), and therefore is slightly larger, and considerably more expensive than its predecessor.

The Berlingo and Partner were officially unveiled in January 2008, with the Berlingo launched first, in the European market, in April 2008, followed by the Partner in May 2008. Mexico sold this generation alongside the original Partner, as do a few other countries, as the Grand Raid and Partner Origin.

An electric version with a traction motor and battery derived from the Mitsubishi i-MiEV was available from 2013. In March 2017, a five-seater Citroen e-Berlingo Multispace was announced.

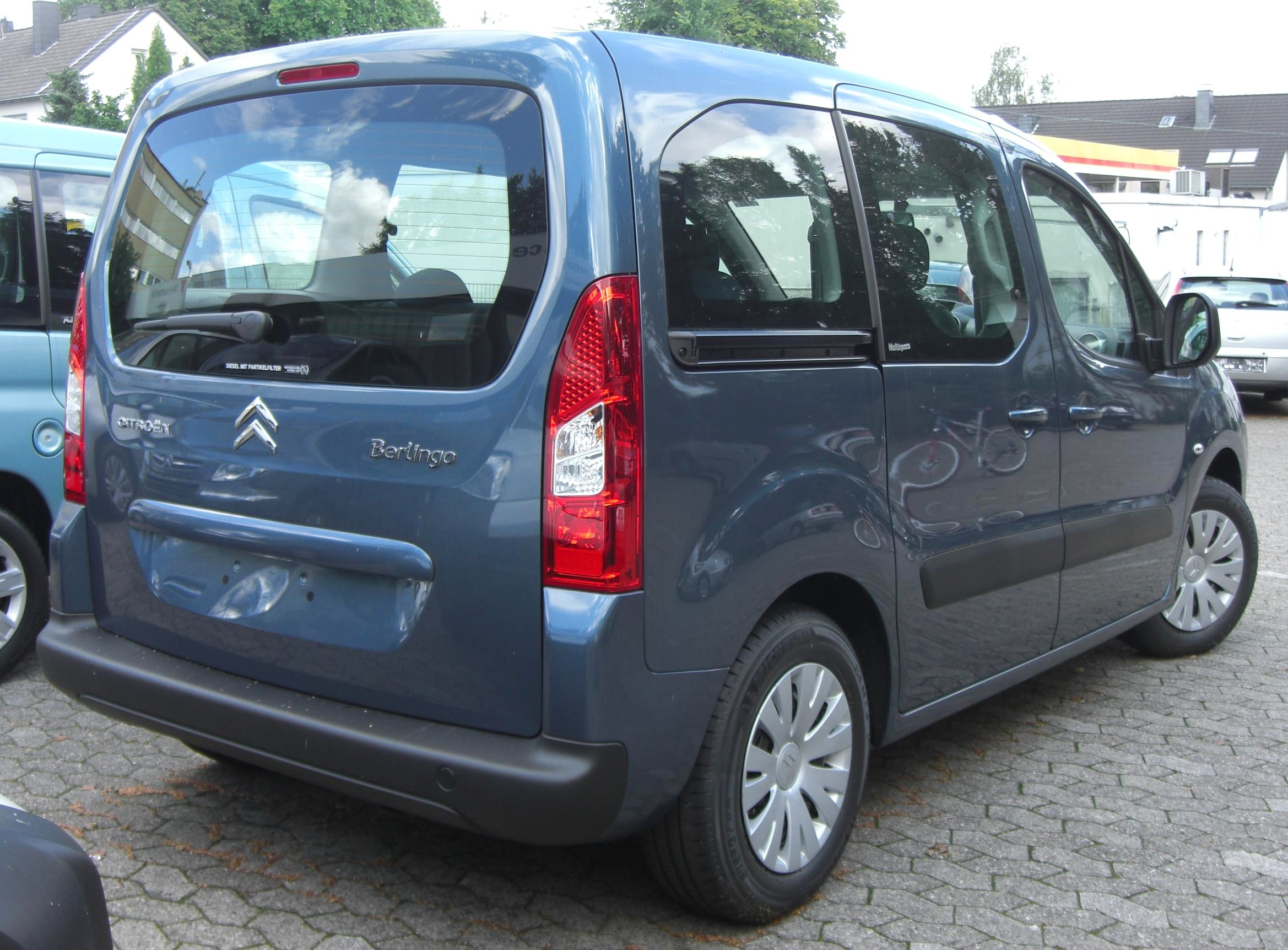
Rear view

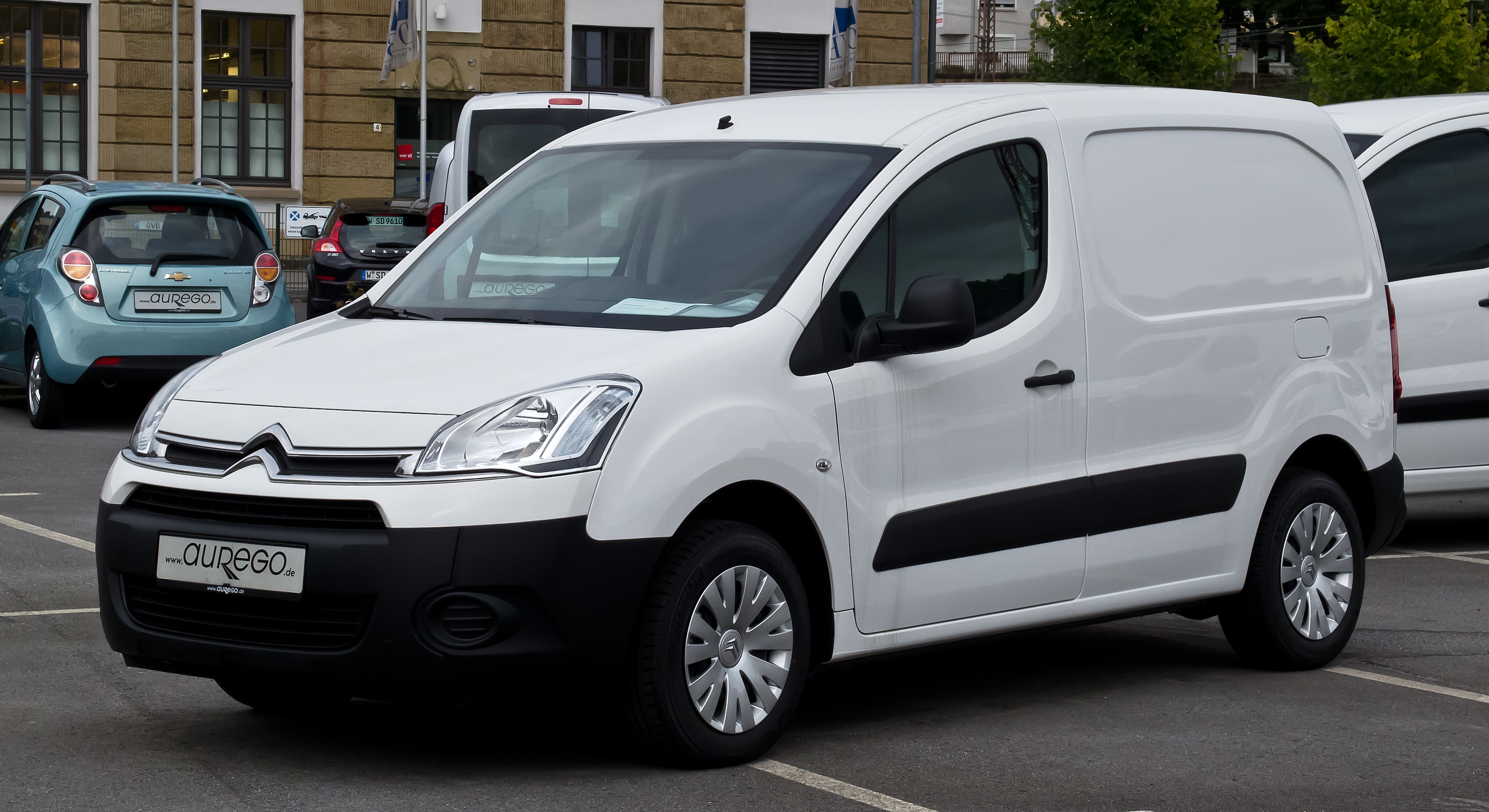
Citroën Berlingo (2012 facelift)

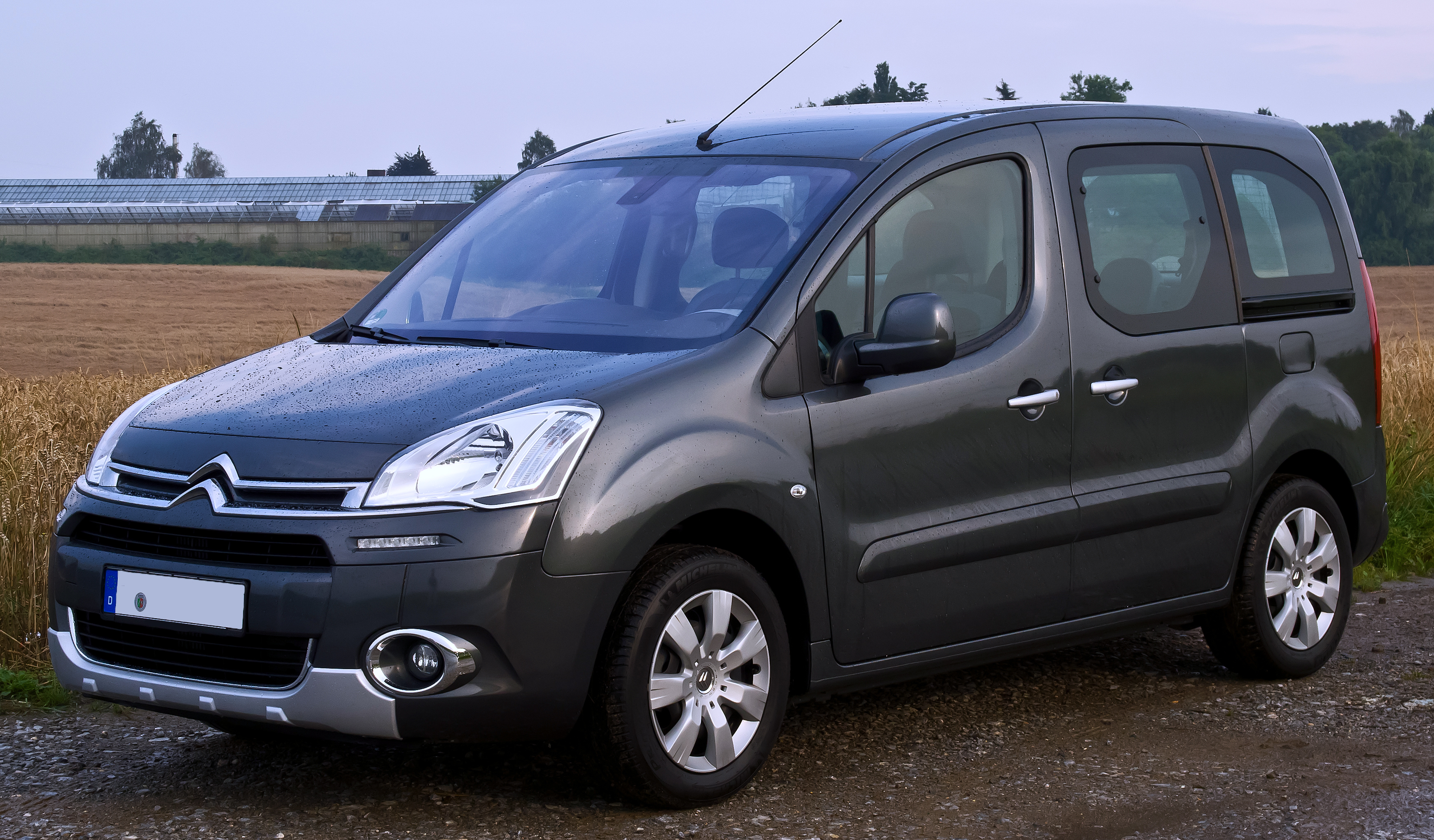
Citroën Berlingo X-TR Multispace (2012 facelift)

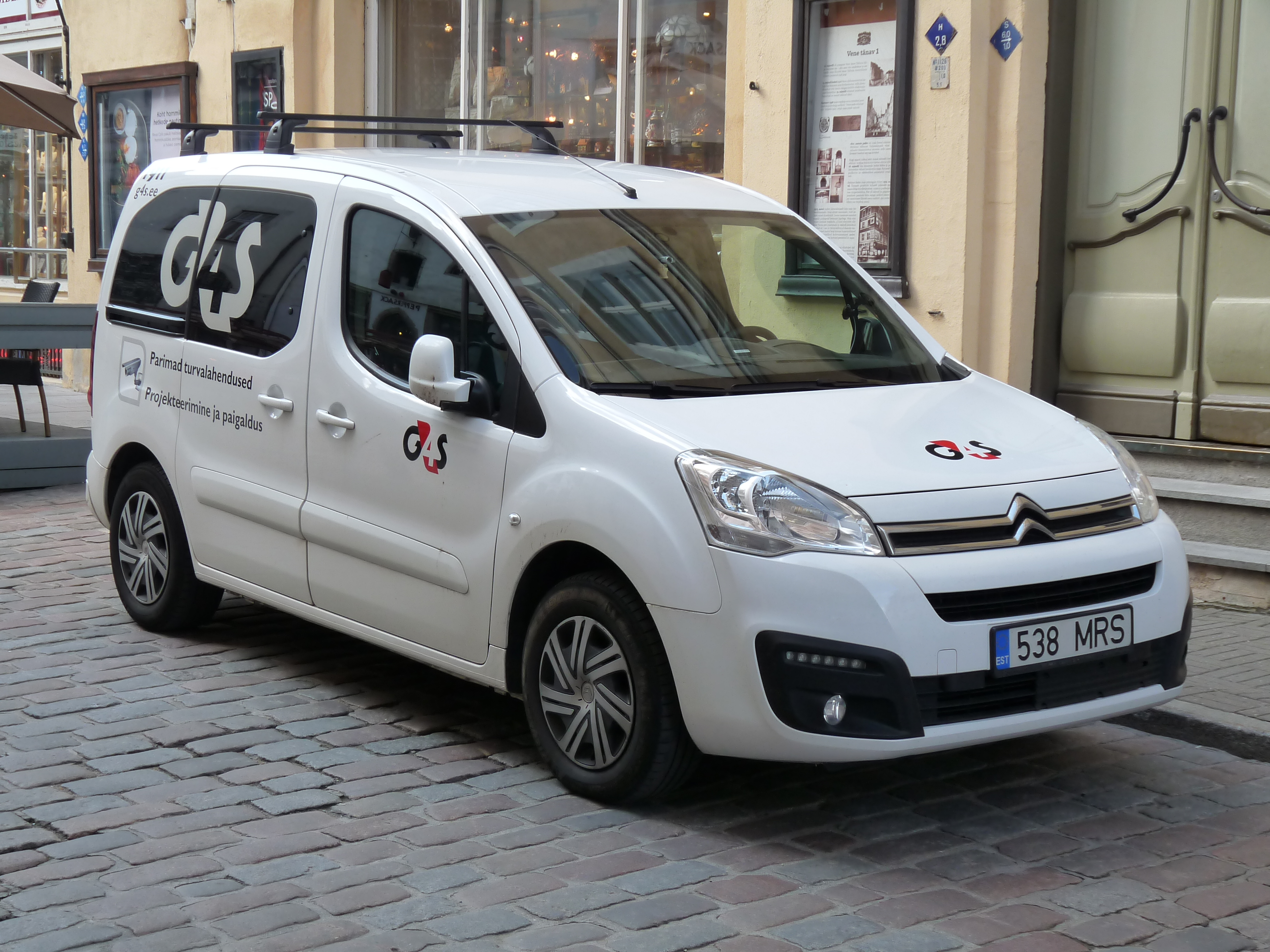
Citroën Berlingo (2015 facelift)

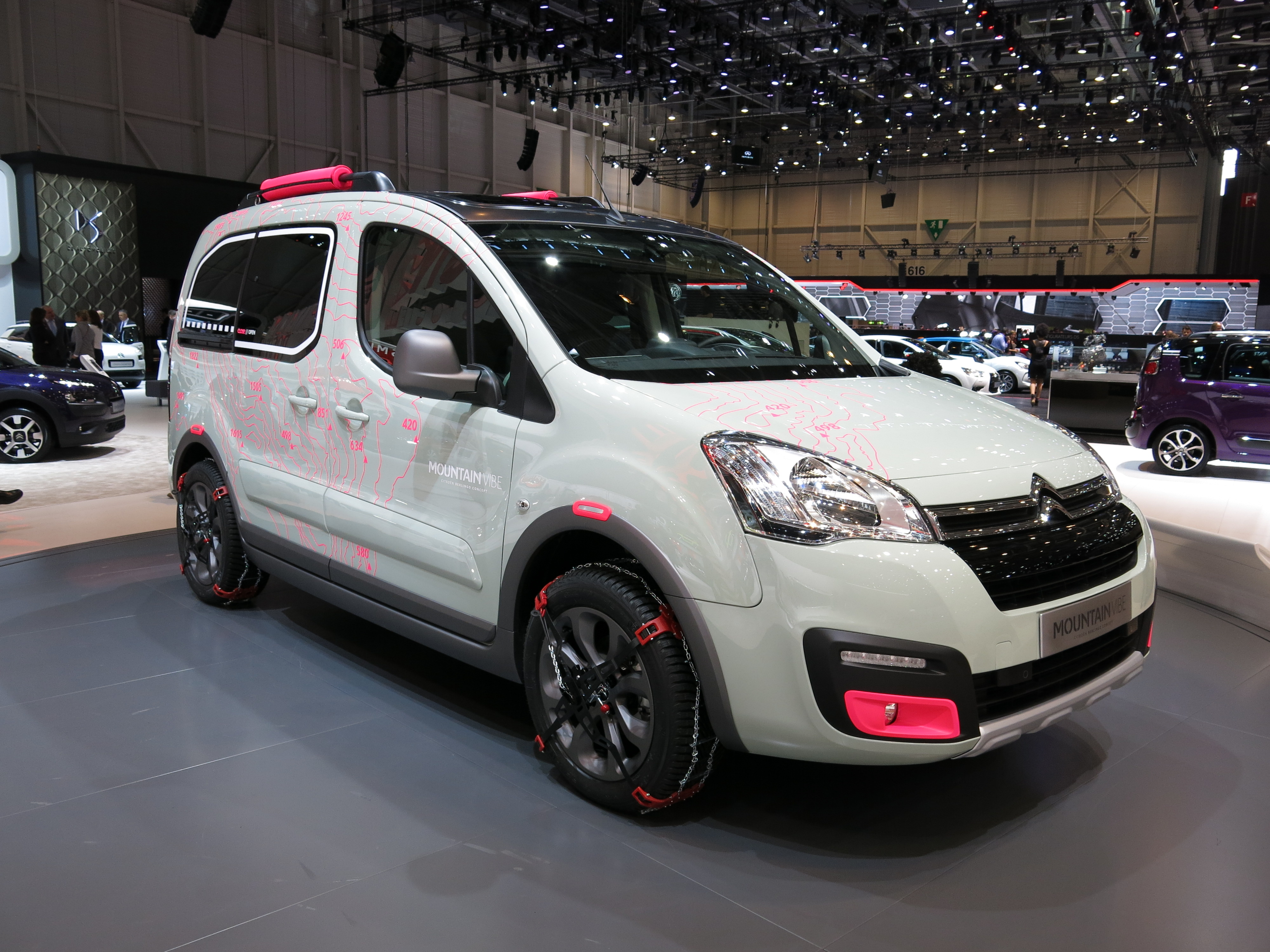
Citroën Berlingo Mountain Vibe Concept

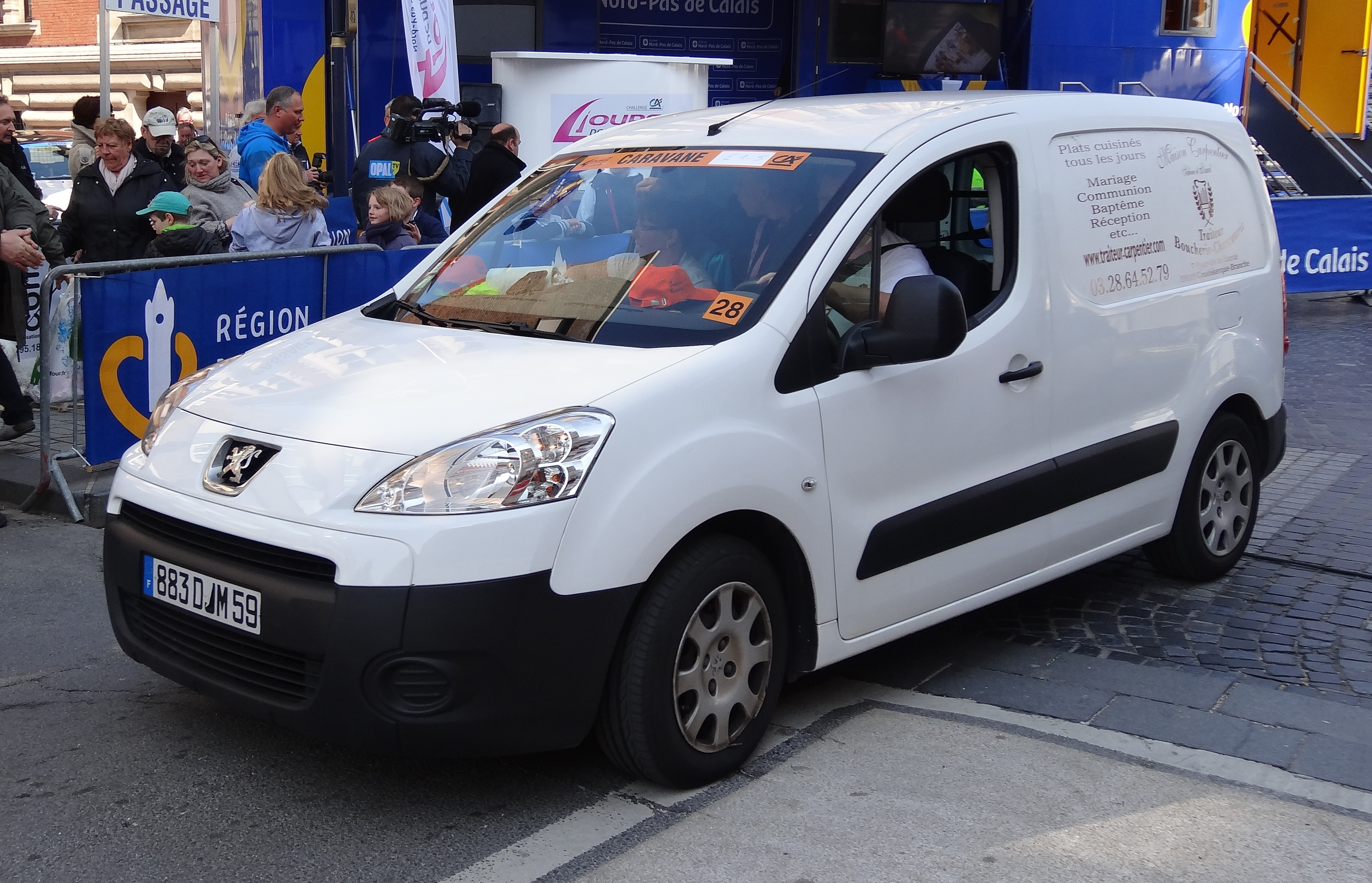
Peugeot Partner (pre-facelift)

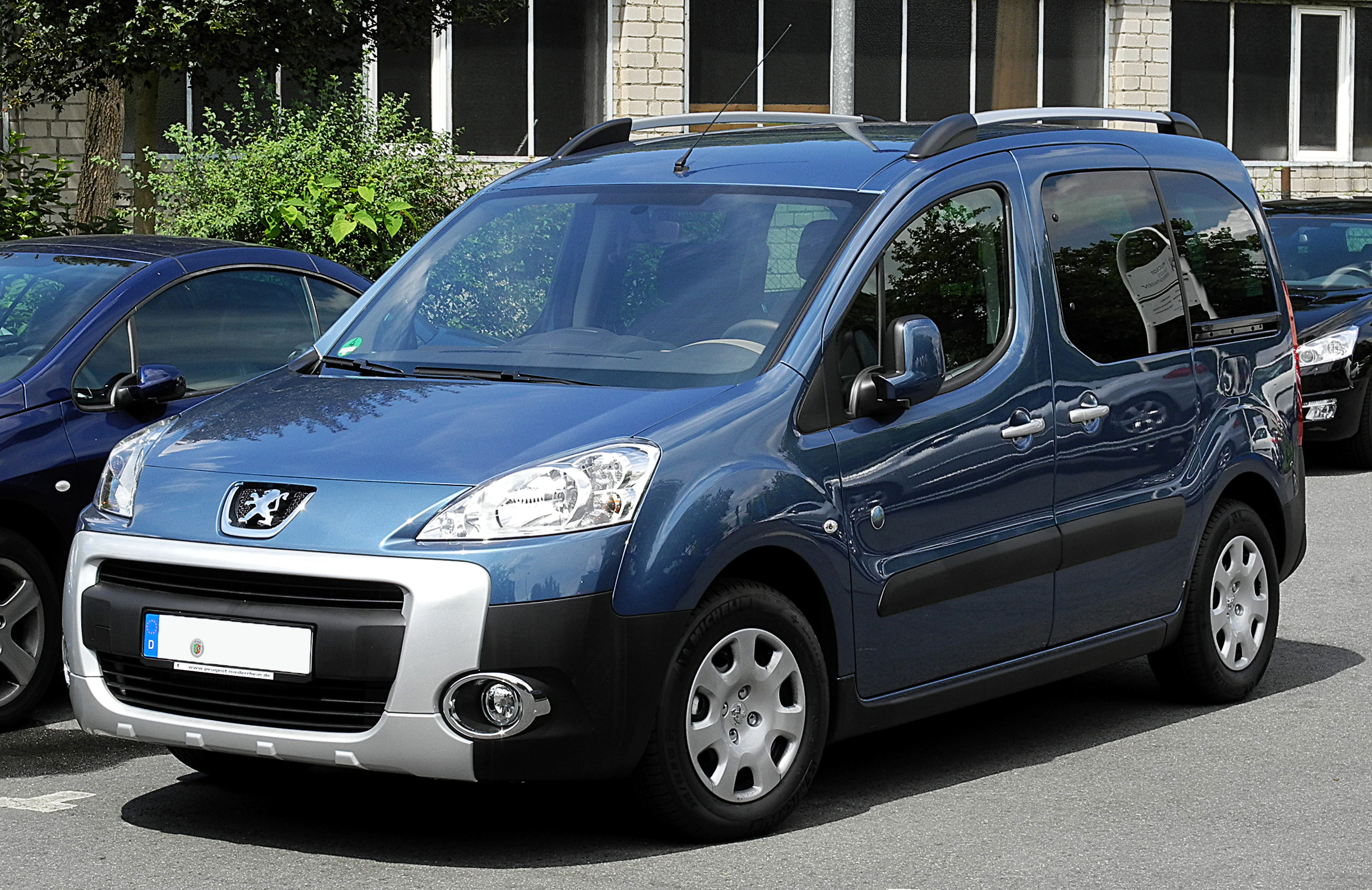
Peugeot Partner Tepee (pre-facelift)

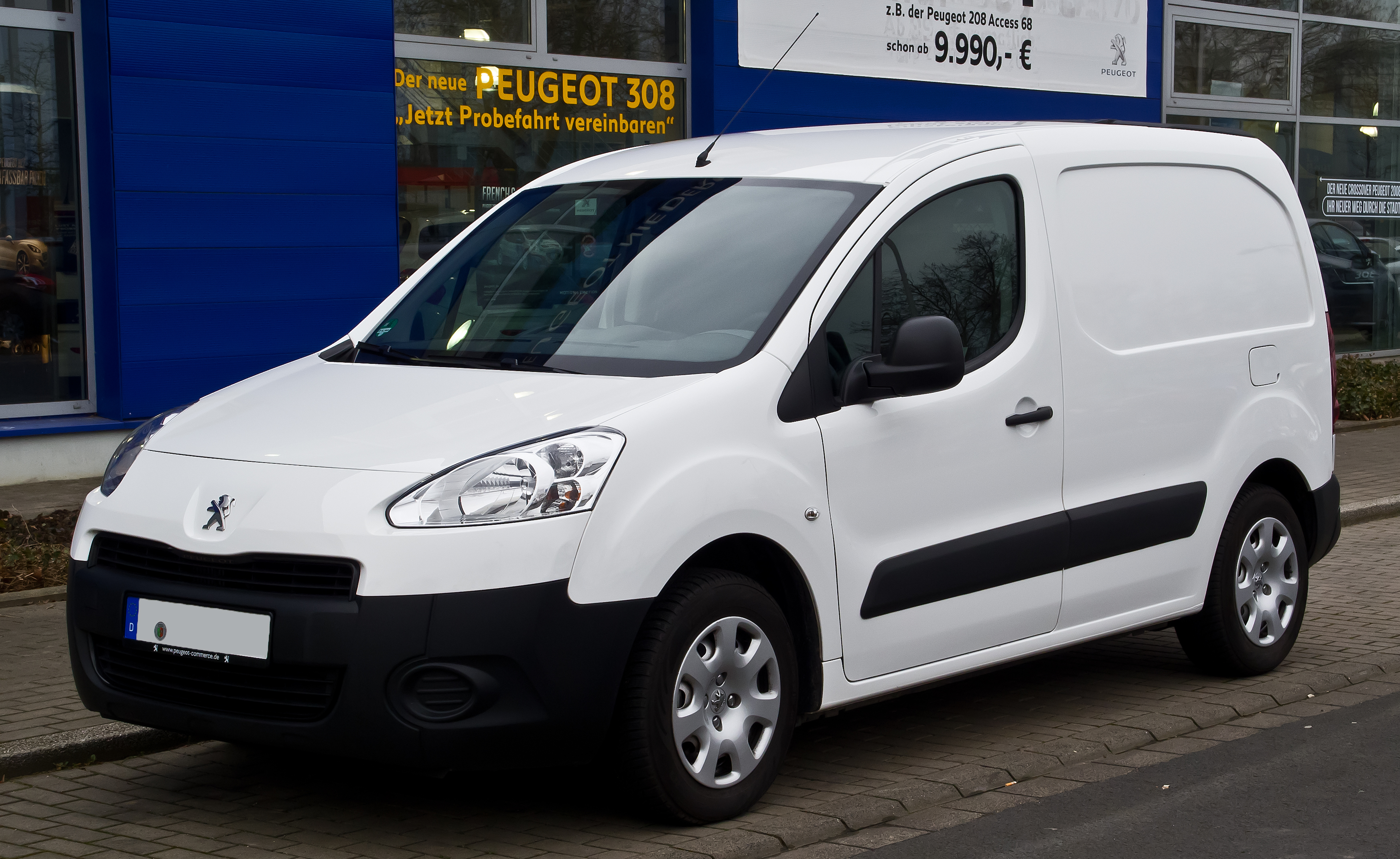
Peugeot Partner (2012 facelift)

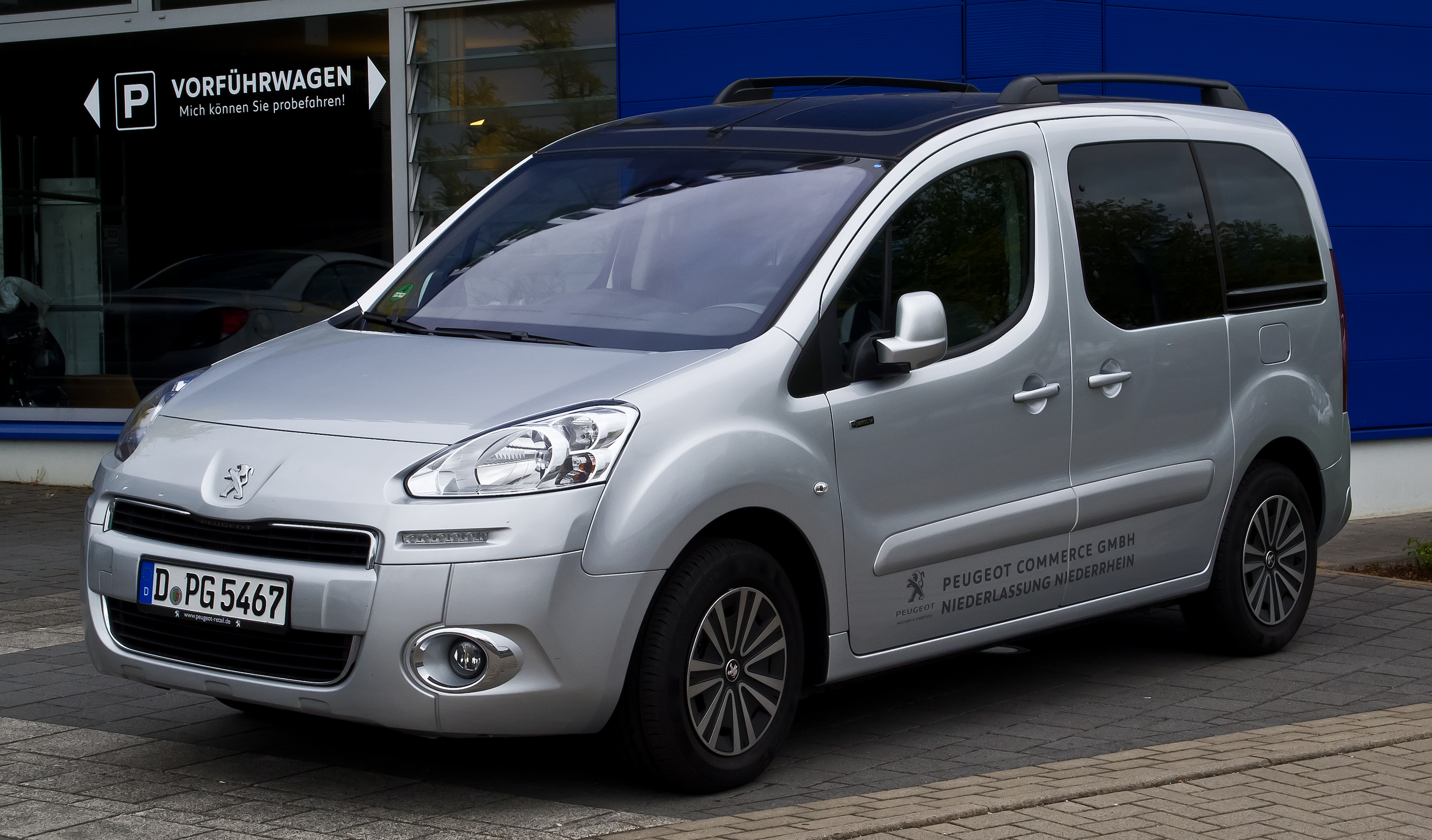
Peugeot Partner Tepee (2012 facelift)

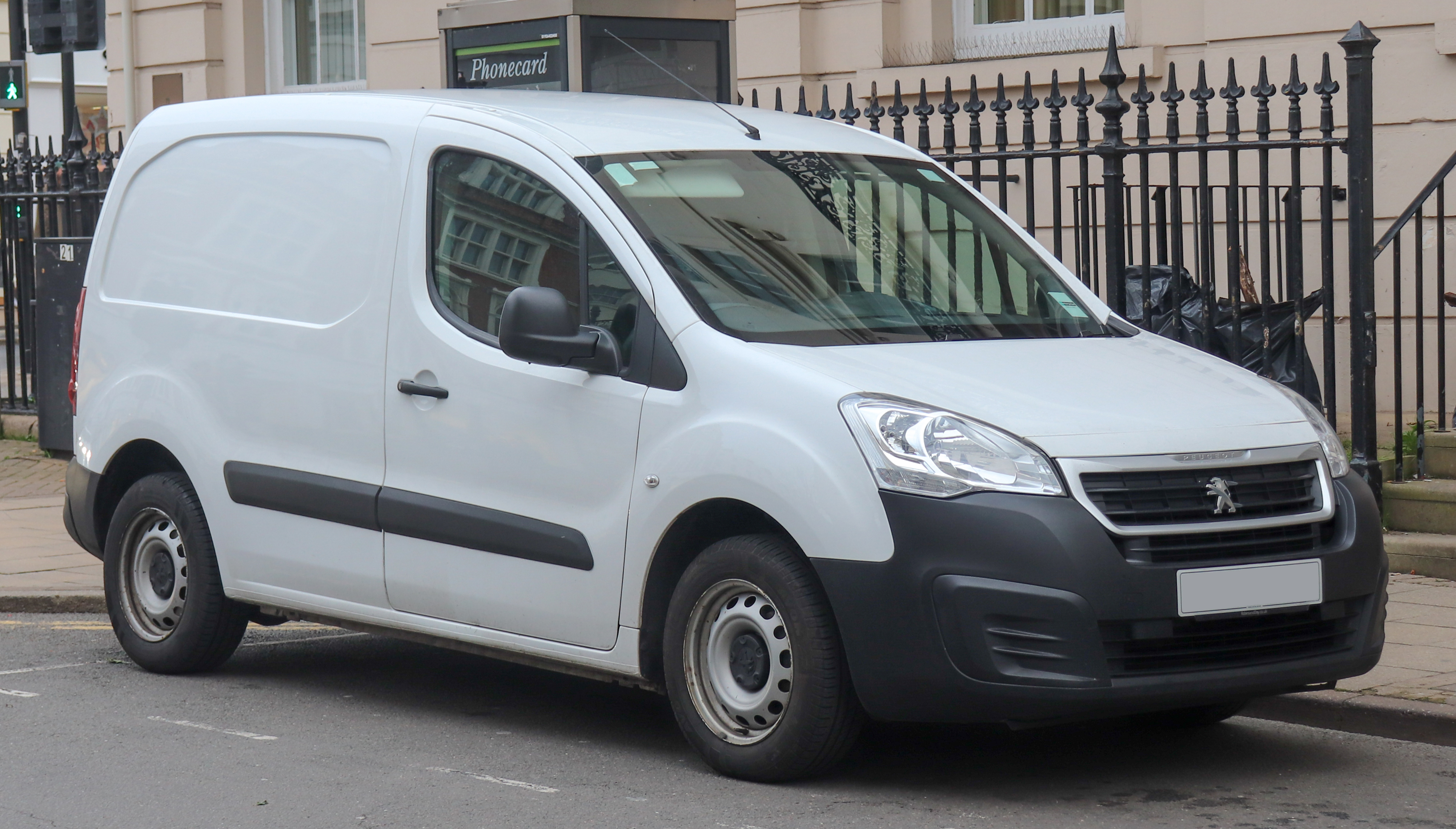
Peugeot Partner (2015 facelift)

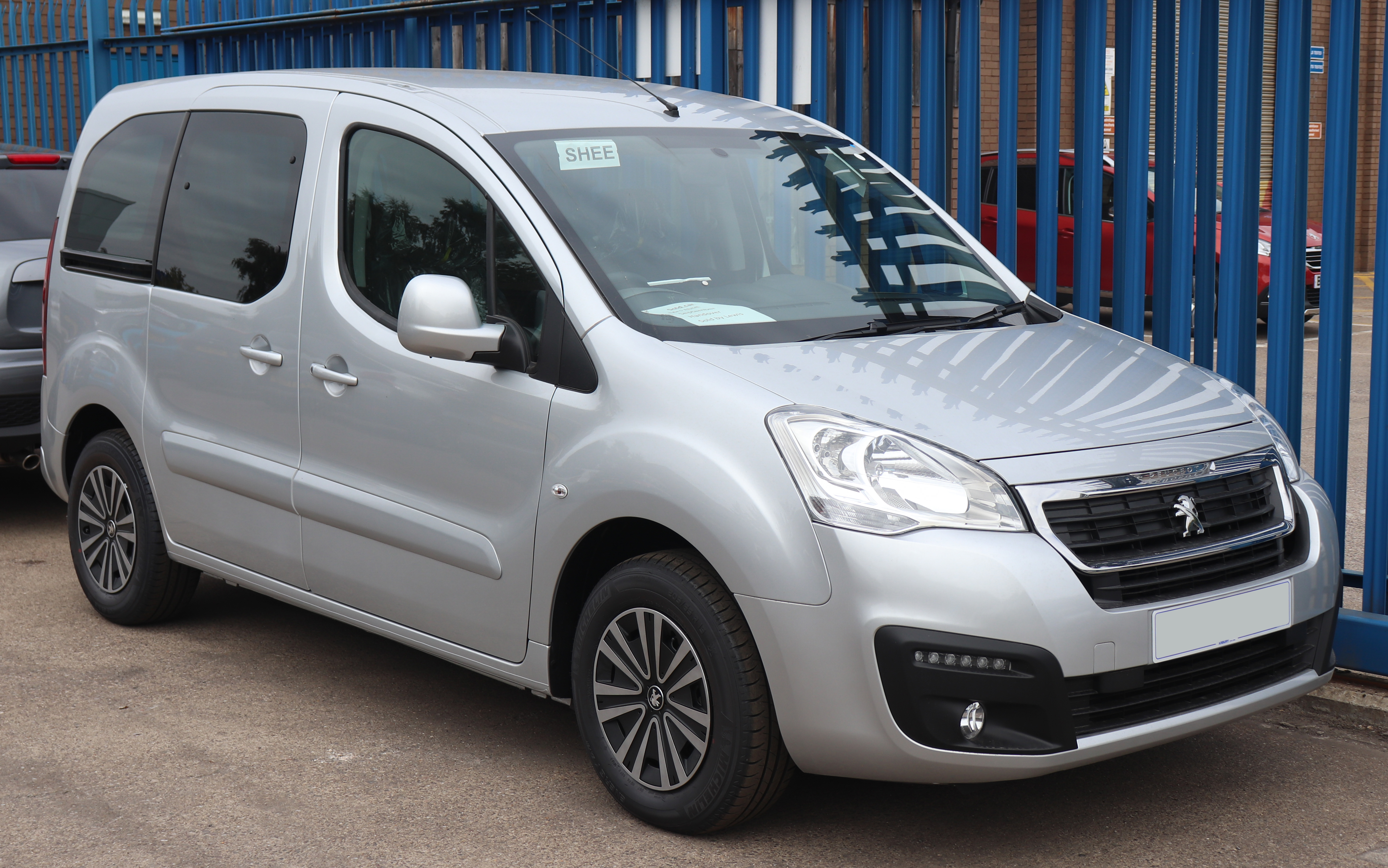
Peugeot Partner Tepee (2015 facelift)

=== Russia ===
This generation was also manufactured and sold in Russia as the Peugeot Partner (and as the passenger oriented Peugeot Partner Crossway), Citroën Berlingo (and Citroën Berlingo Multispace) and exclusive Opel Combo Cargo (and Opel Combo Life) since March 2021.

Opel Combo Life

Opel Combo Life (rear view)

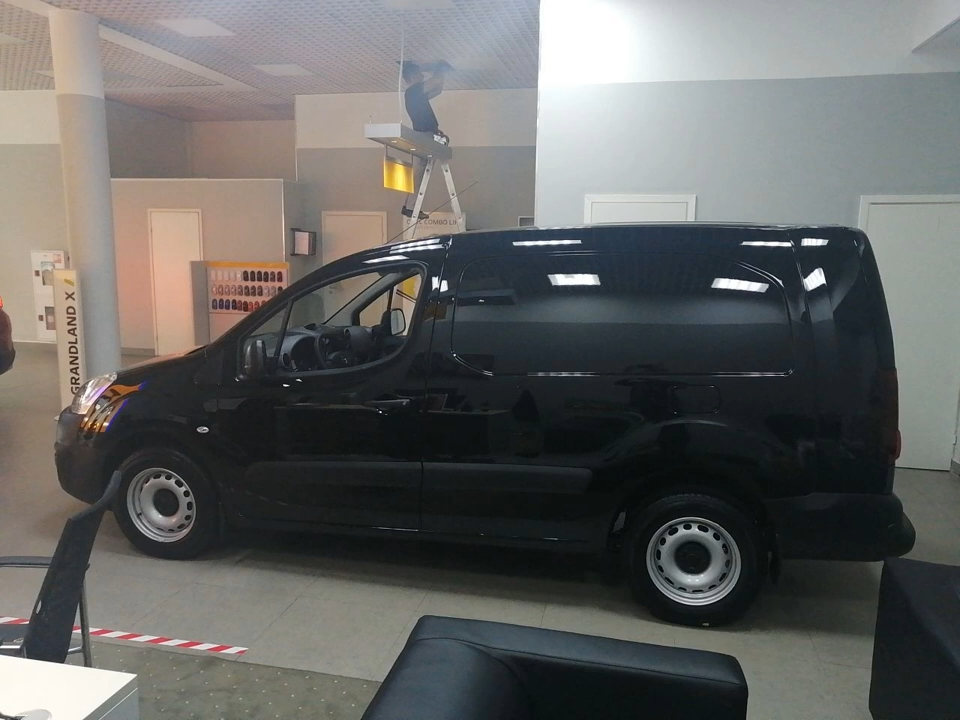
Opel Combo Cargo

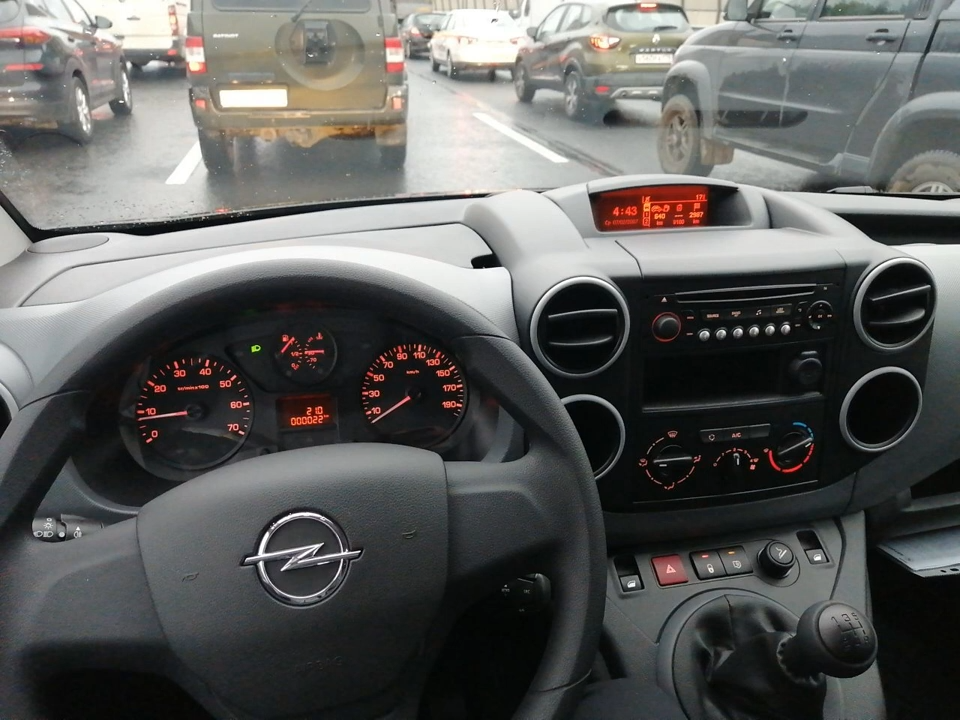
Opel Combo Cargo (interior view)

=== Engines ===
Petrol engine
Model	Engine	Displacement	Power	Torque	Note	CO_{2} emission (g/km)
1.6i 16V	I4	1587 cc	90 PS (66 kW; 89 hp) @5800 rpm	132 N⋅m (97 lb⋅ft) @2500 rpm		195

Diesel engine
Model	Engine	Displacement	Power	Torque	Note	CO_{2} emission (g/km)
1.6HDi 16V	I4	1560 cc	75 PS (55 kW; 74 hp) @4000 rpm	185 N⋅m (136 lb⋅ft) @1750 rpm		149
1.6HDi 16V	I4	1560 cc	90 PS (66 kW; 89 hp) @4000 rpm	215 N⋅m (159 lb⋅ft) @1750 rpm		149
1.6HDi 16V	I4	1560 cc	110 PS (81 kW; 108 hp) @4000 rpm	240 N⋅m (177 lb⋅ft) @1750 rpm		140
1.6 BlueHDi 8V	I4	1560 cc	75 PS (55 kW; 74 hp)		BVM5	113
1.6 BlueHDi 8V	I4	1560 cc	100 PS (74 kW; 99 hp)		BVM5	113
1.6 BlueHDi 8V	I4	1560 cc	120 PS (88 kW; 118 hp)	300 N⋅m (221 lbf⋅ft)	BVM6	113

Electric engine
Model	Engine	Power	Torque	Note	CO_{2} emission (g/km)
Berlingo Electric		49 kW (66 hp; 67 PS)	200 N⋅m (148 lb⋅ft)		0

=== Safety ===
ANCAP test results* Citroen Berlingo variants with dual frontal airbags (2009)
Test	Score
Overall	4 /5 stars
Frontal offset	11.55/16
Side impact	14.65/16
Pole	Not Assessed
Seat belt reminders	1/3
Whiplash protection	Not Assessed
Pedestrian protection	Marginal
Electronic stability control	Optional

== Third generation (K9; 2018) ==
Third generation
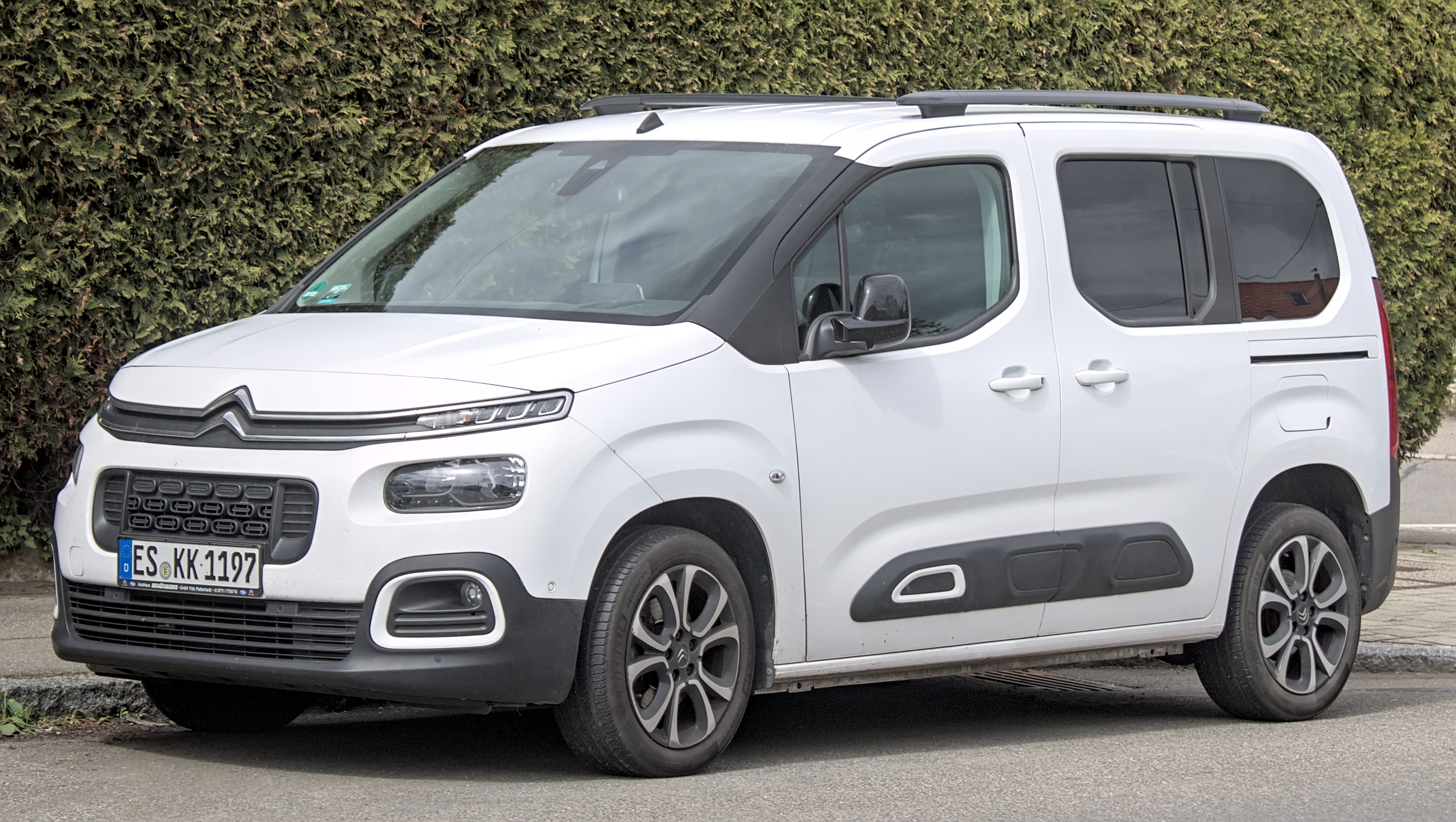
- Citroën Berlingo

Overview
- Model code: K9 / EK9
- Also called: Peugeot Partner / Rifter; Opel Combo E; Vauxhall Combo (United Kingdom); Toyota ProAce City (2019–present); Fiat Doblò III (2022–present); Fiat Qubo (2026–present)
- Production: 2018–present
- Assembly: Spain: Vigo (PSA Vigo Plant); Algeria: Oran (Stellantis Tafraoui); Portugal: Mangualde (PSA Mangualde Plant); United Kingdom: Ellesmere Port (Vauxhall Ellesmere Port); Turkey: Bursa (Tofaş)
- Designer: Under the lead of Gilles Vidal

Body and chassis
- Body style: 4/5-door panel van 5-door passenger van
- Platform: PSA EMP2
- Related: Peugeot 308; Citroën C4 Picasso

Powertrain
- Engine: Petrol: 1.2 L EB2 Puretech turbo I3; 1.6 L EC5 VTi I4 I4; Diesel: 1.5 L DV5 BlueHDi I4; 1.6 L DV6 D HDi/BlueHDi I4
- Electric motor: 136 PS (100 kW; 134 hp) PMSM (electric versions)
- Transmission: 5-speed manual 6-speed manual 8-speed Aisin automatic EAT8
- Battery: 50/52 kWh lithium-ion (electric versions)
- Electric range: 330km WLTP (Toyota Proace City Electric)

Dimensions
- Wheelbase: 2,785–2,975 mm (109.6–117.1 in)
- Length: 4,403–4,753 mm (173.3–187.1 in)
- Width: 1,848 mm (72.8 in)
- Height: 1,796–1,860 mm (70.7–73.2 in)

The third generation Berlingo and a new Peugeot Rifter was officially unveiled at the 2018 Geneva Auto Show. The model is also sold as the fourth generation Opel and Vauxhall Combo after the PSA Group bought Opel in March 2017 and, from the end of 2019, as the Toyota ProAce City, following the extension of the partnership in utility vehicles between PSA and Toyota. The ProAce City was officially unveiled at the 2019 Commercial Vehicle Show in Birmingham. The Fiat-badged version was released as the Fiat Doblò in June 2022 in both ICE and e-Doblò electric version.

The third generation Berlingo is the first of the nameplate to be launched in Japan, in October 2019.

In January 2022, Stellantis stops marketing the internal combustion versions (diesel and gasoline) of its passenger vans in United Kingdom, Norway and European Union countries. This decision is motivated by a decision to reduce the average CO_{2} emissions of vehicles marketed by the company in Europe in accordance with EU regulations on emissions. As a result, the Berlingo, Rifter and Combo Life are (as of 2022) only offered in their battery electric version. Panel vans are not affected by this change, nor are Toyota-badged models, as the Japanese manufacturer is in line with the objectives of the CAFE regulations. The internal combustion variants of the Stellantis passenger vans are expected to return in 2023 with a mild-hybrid system.

=== Electric versions ===
On 14 January 2021, Citroën unveiled the electric ë-Berlingo Van, which was followed 6 days later by the Opel Combo-e Cargo and the Vauxhall Combo-e, and again 6 days later by the Peugeot e-Partner. On 26 February 2021 Peugeot introduced e-Rifter, and on 4 May 2021, Toyota unveiled ProAce City Electric and ProAce City Verso Electric.

In 2023, production began at the Ellesmere Port factory.

=== Variants ===
==== Caselani Fourgonnette ====
Inspired by the 1951 Citroën 2CV Fourgonnette, it is a retro-bodied Berlingo coach-built by the Italian firm Caselani, with production limited to 200 units. Manufacture started in October 2022. It was unveiled at the 2022 Paris Motor Show.

==== Commercial versions ====
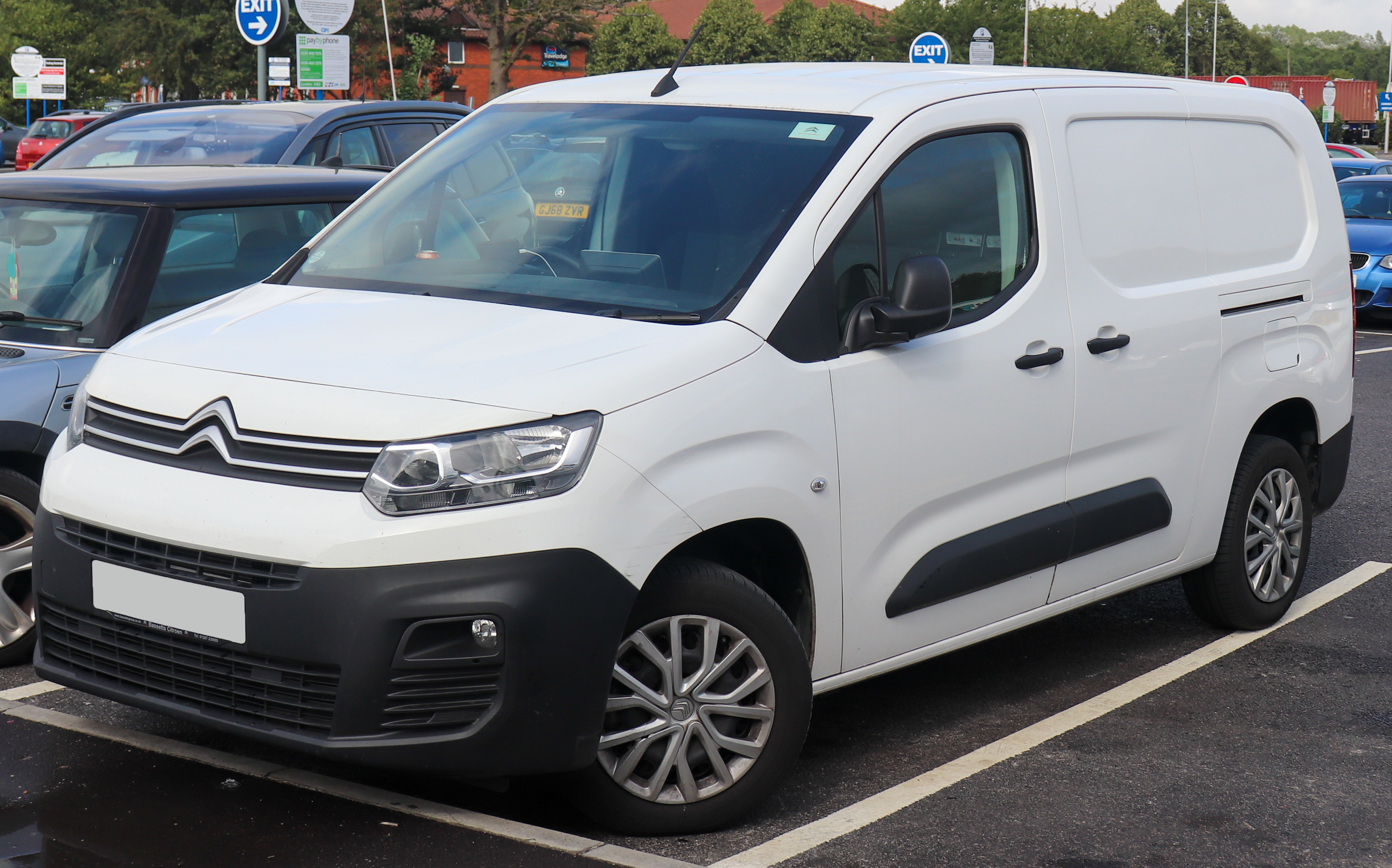
Citroën Berlingo van, note that it has a different front end design than the passenger version

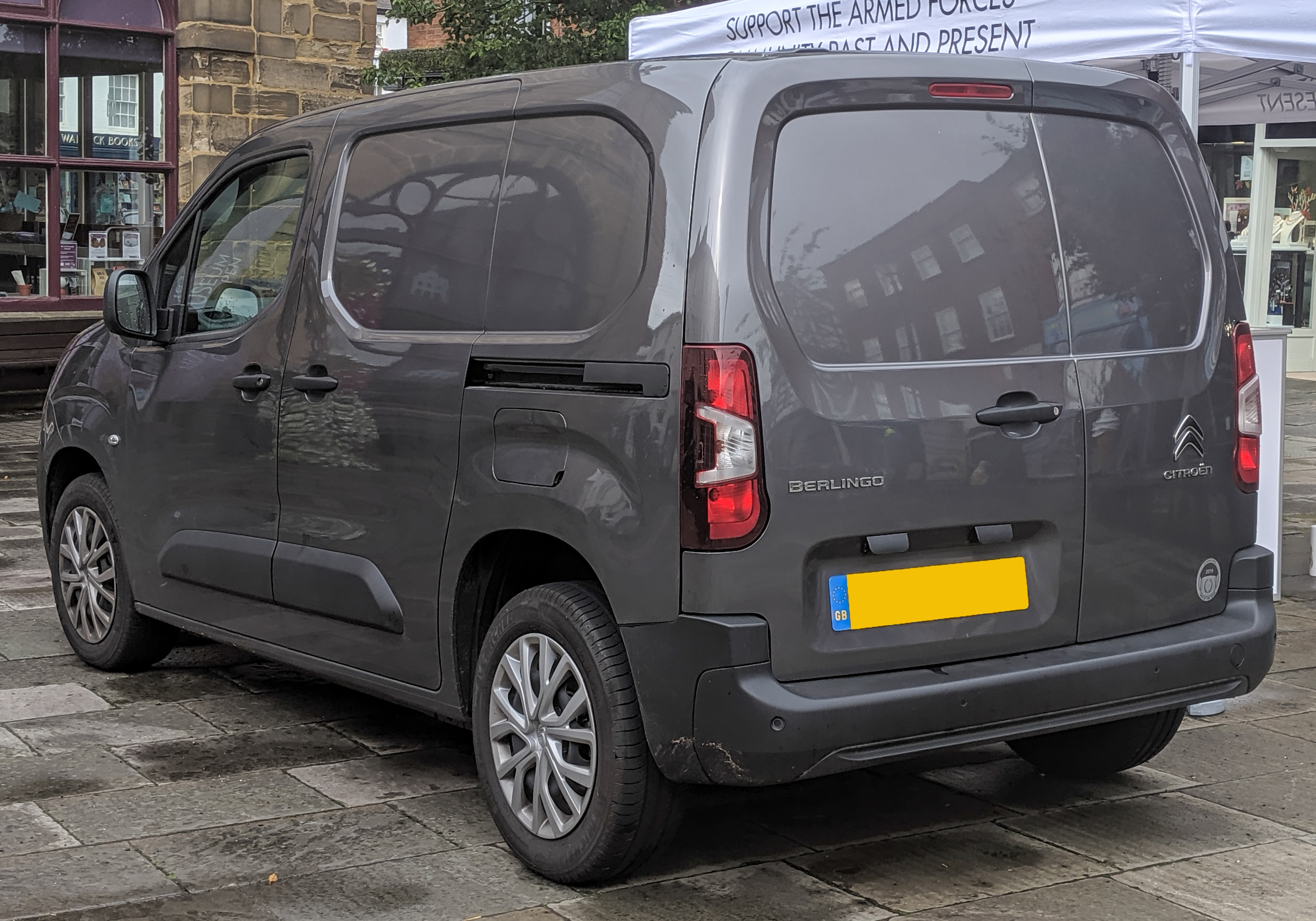
Citroën Berlingo van (rear)

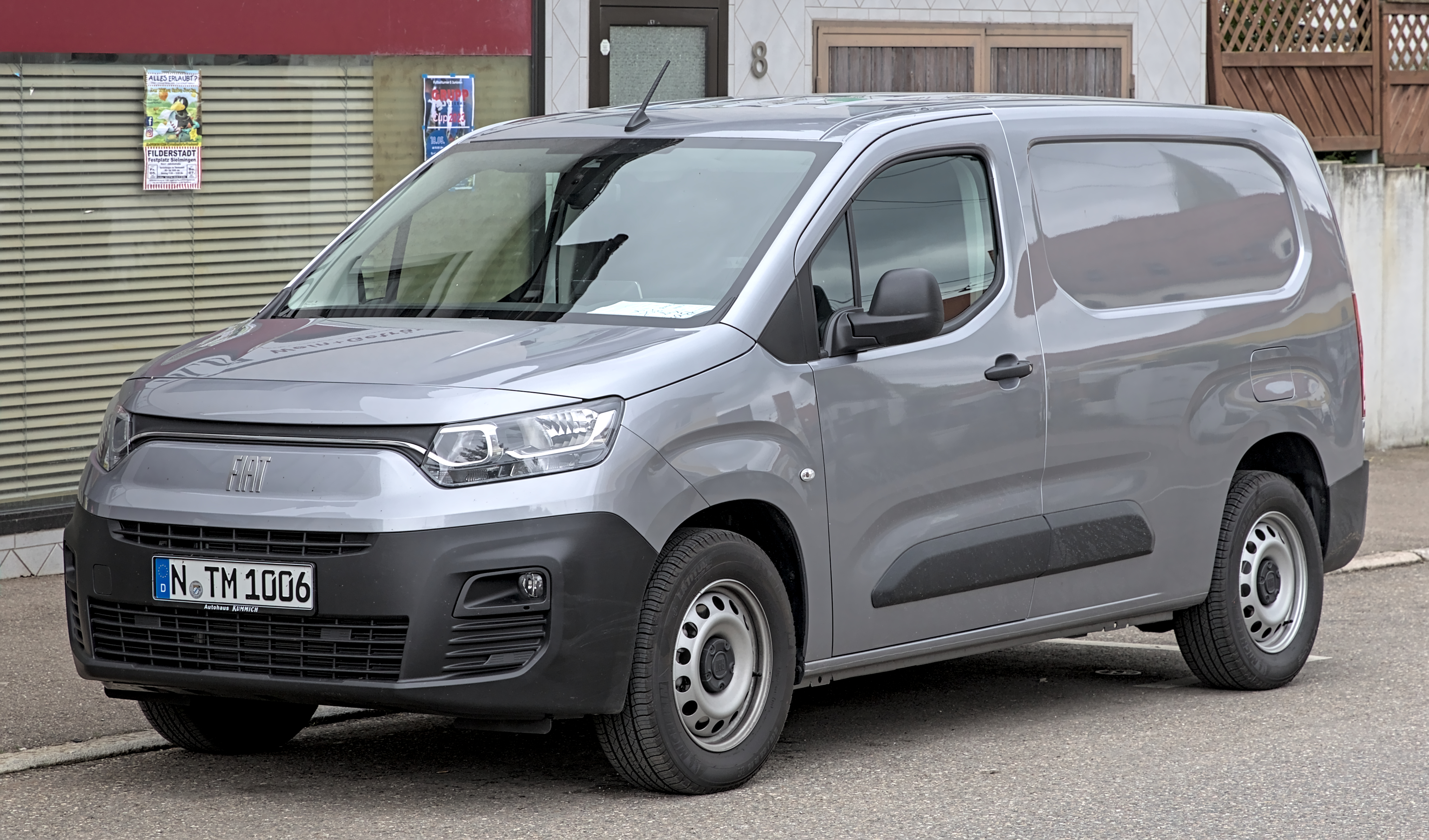
Fiat Doblò

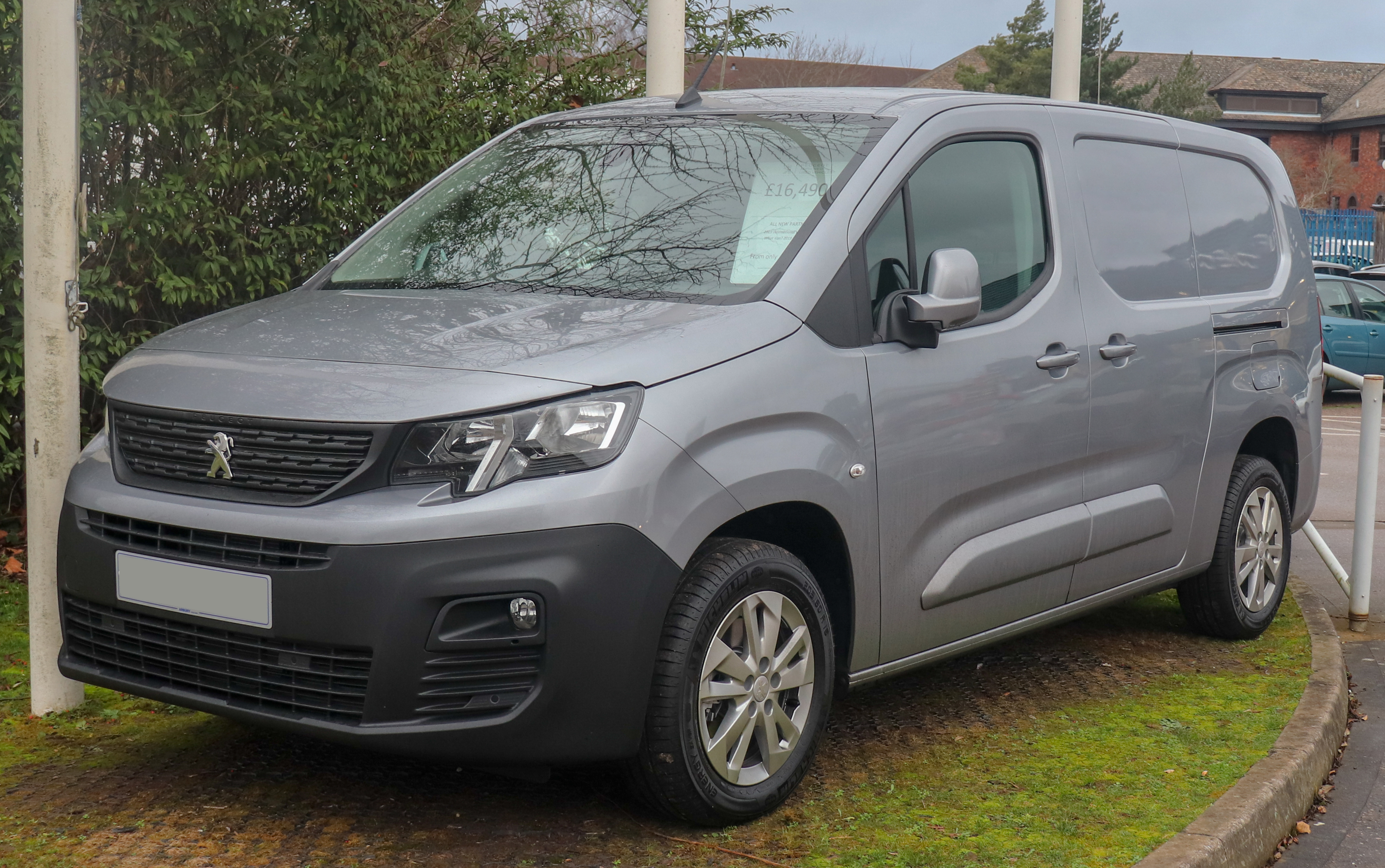
Peugeot Partner

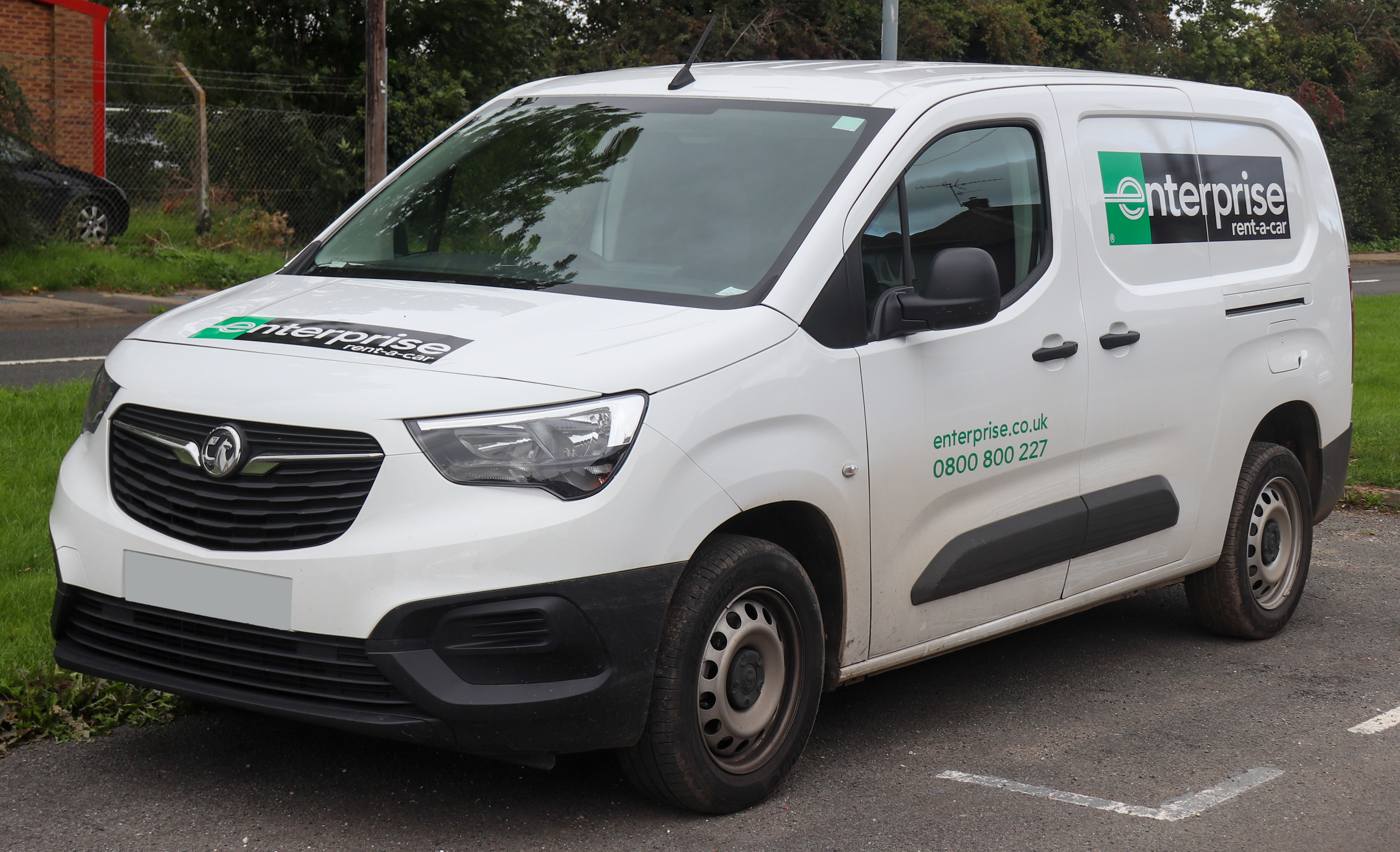
Vauxhall Combo

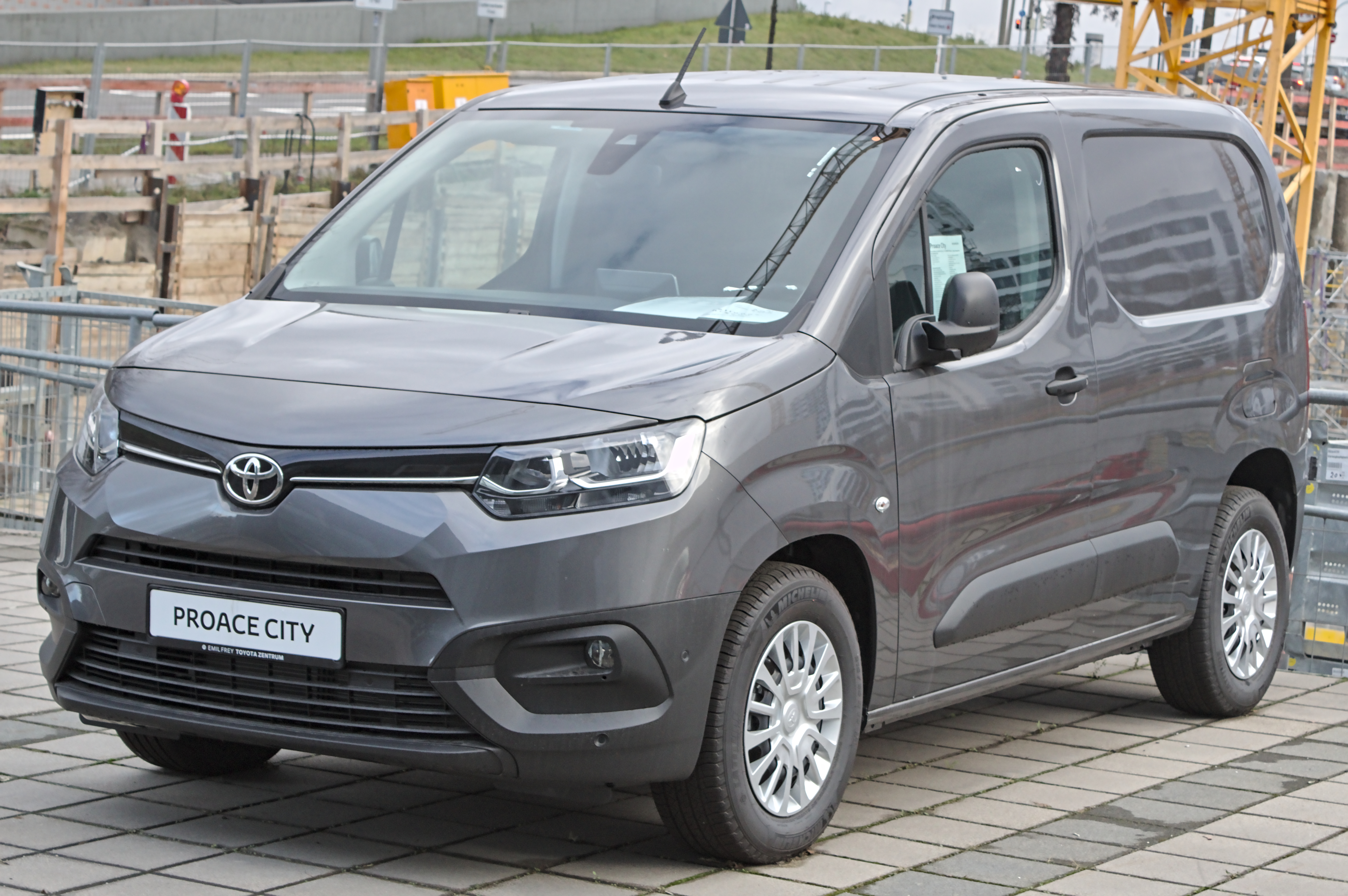
Toyota ProAce City

==== Passenger versions ====
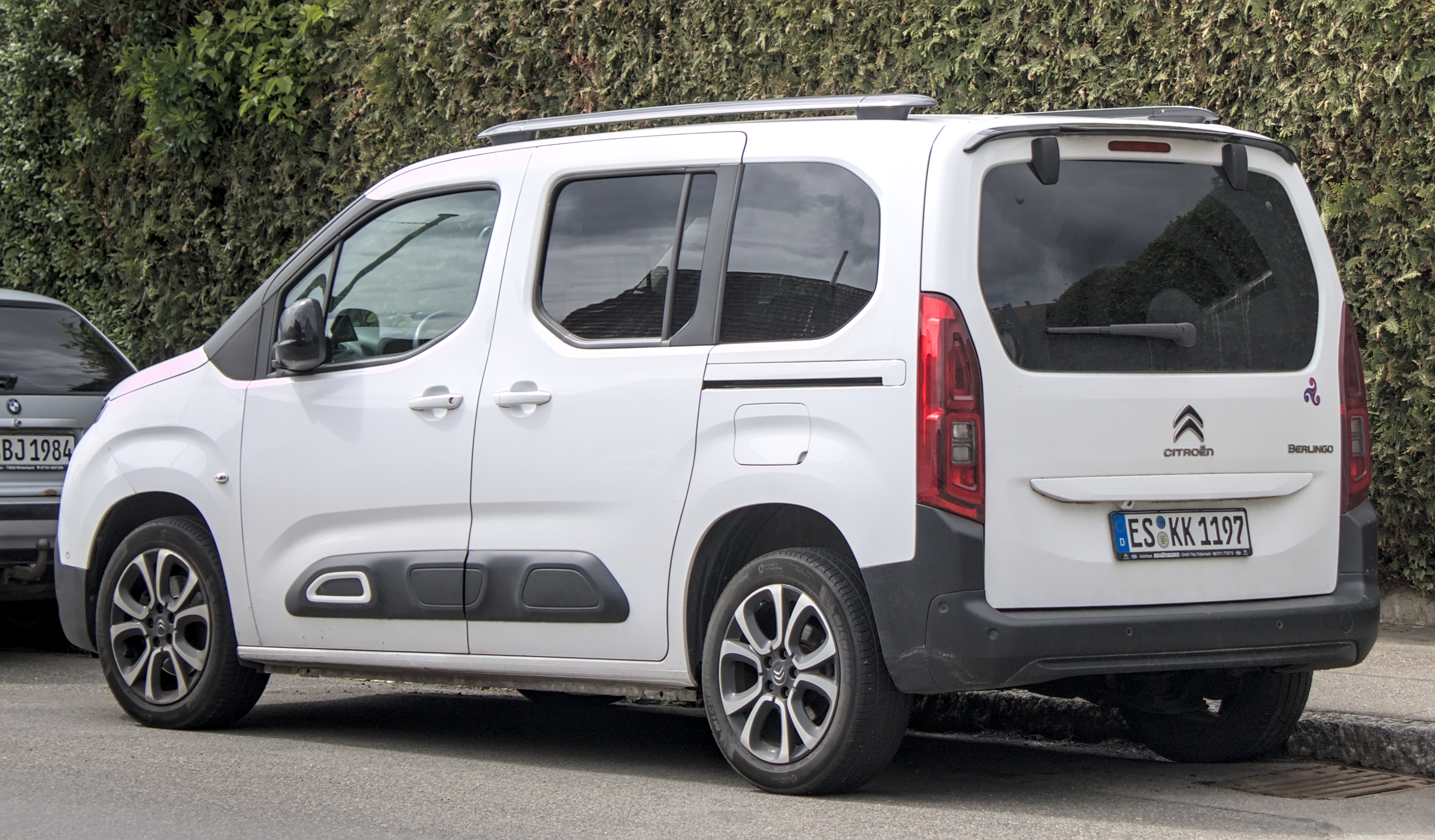
Citroën Berlingo

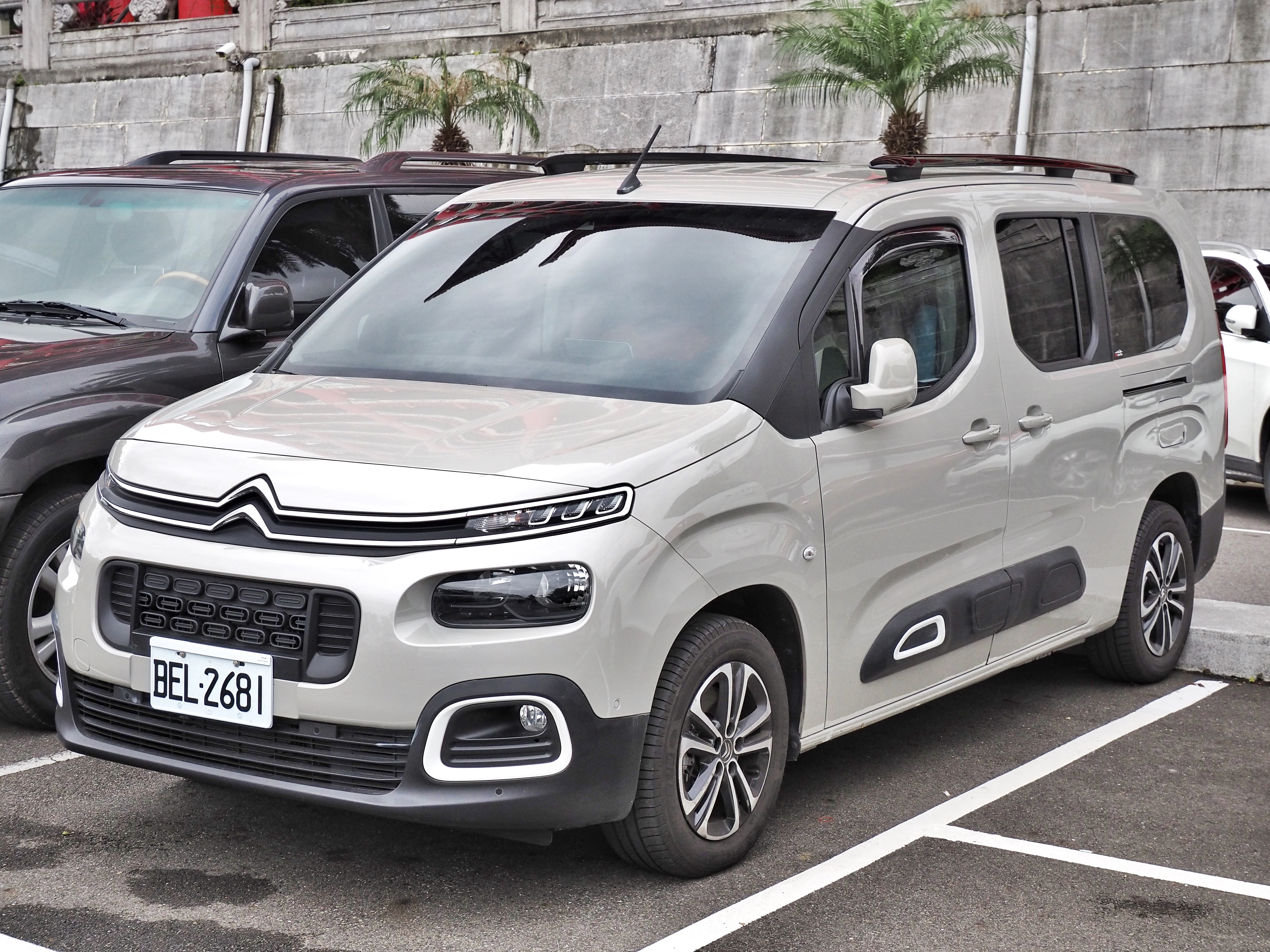
Citroën Berlingo XL

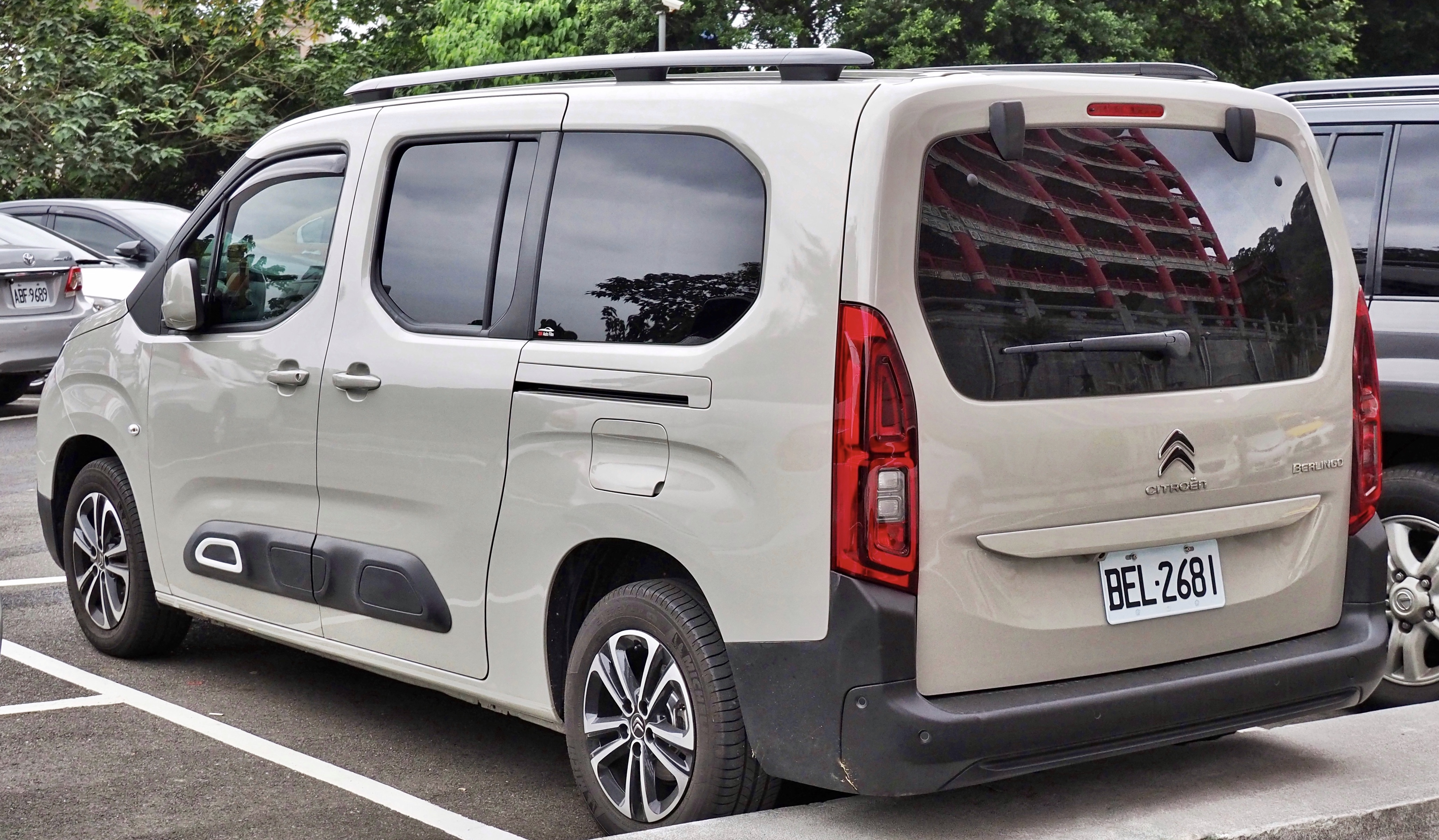
Citroën Berlingo XL

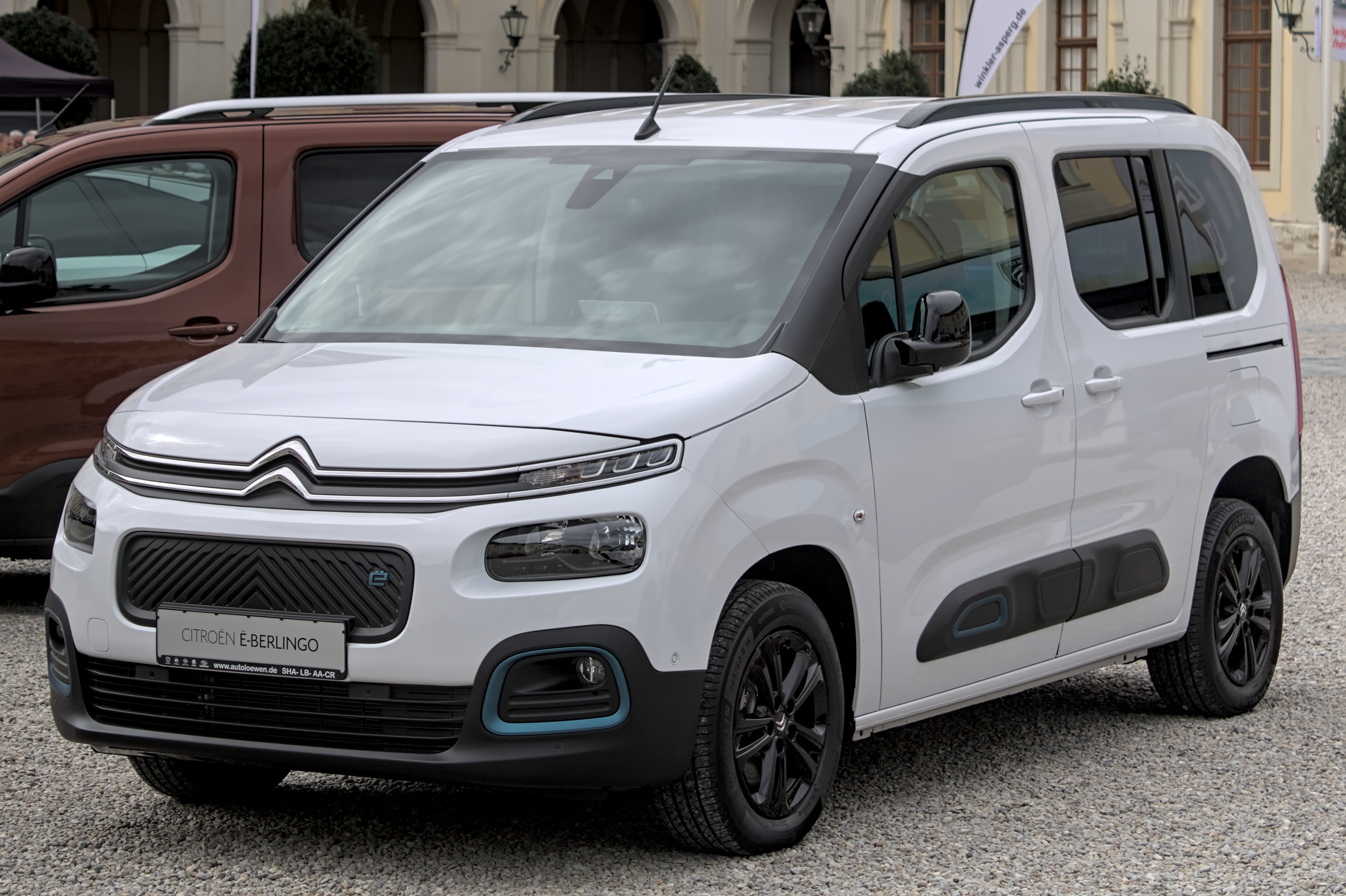
Citroën ë-Berlingo

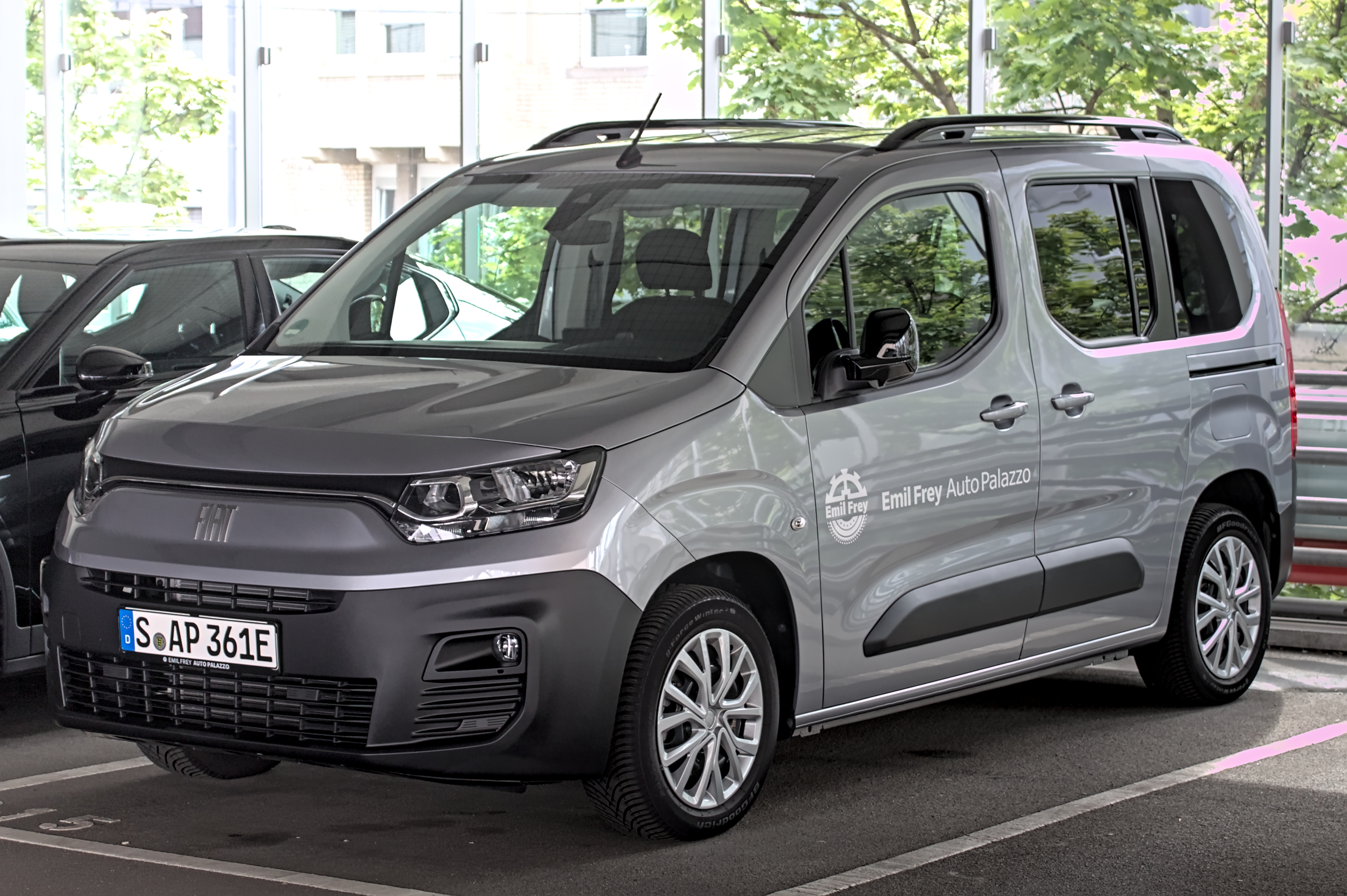
Fiat E-Doblò

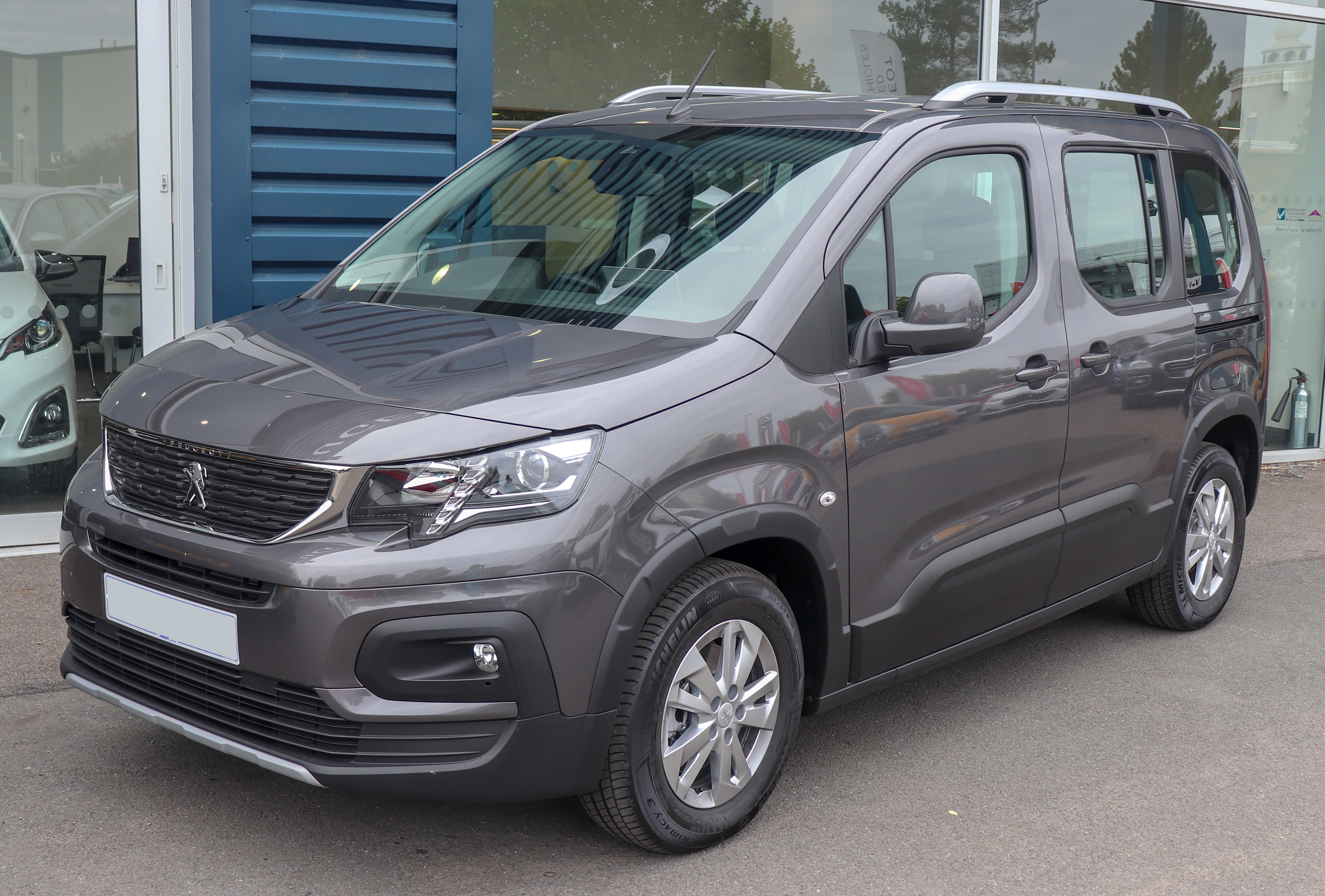
Peugeot Rifter

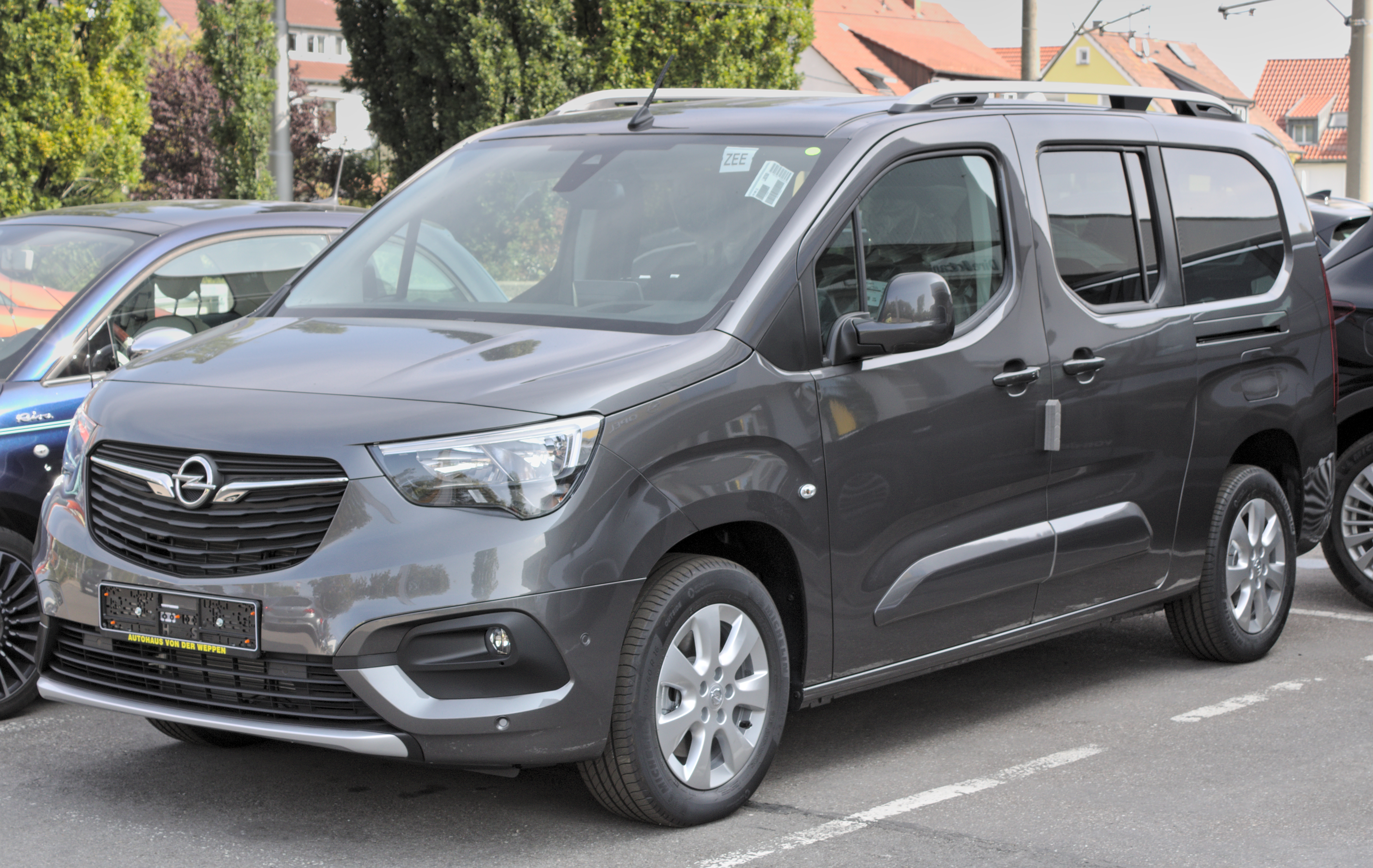
Opel Combo Life XL

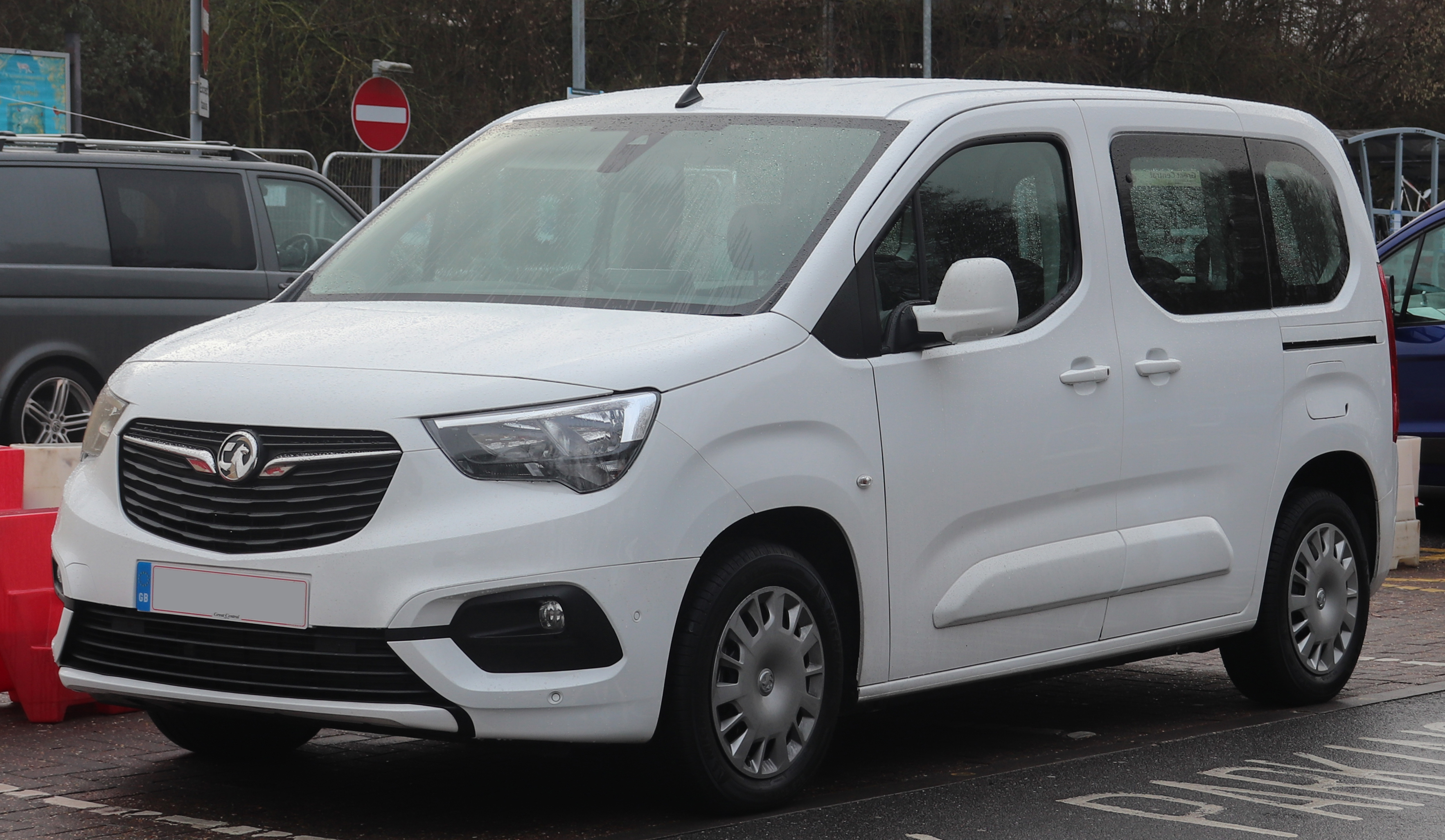
Vauxhall Combo Life

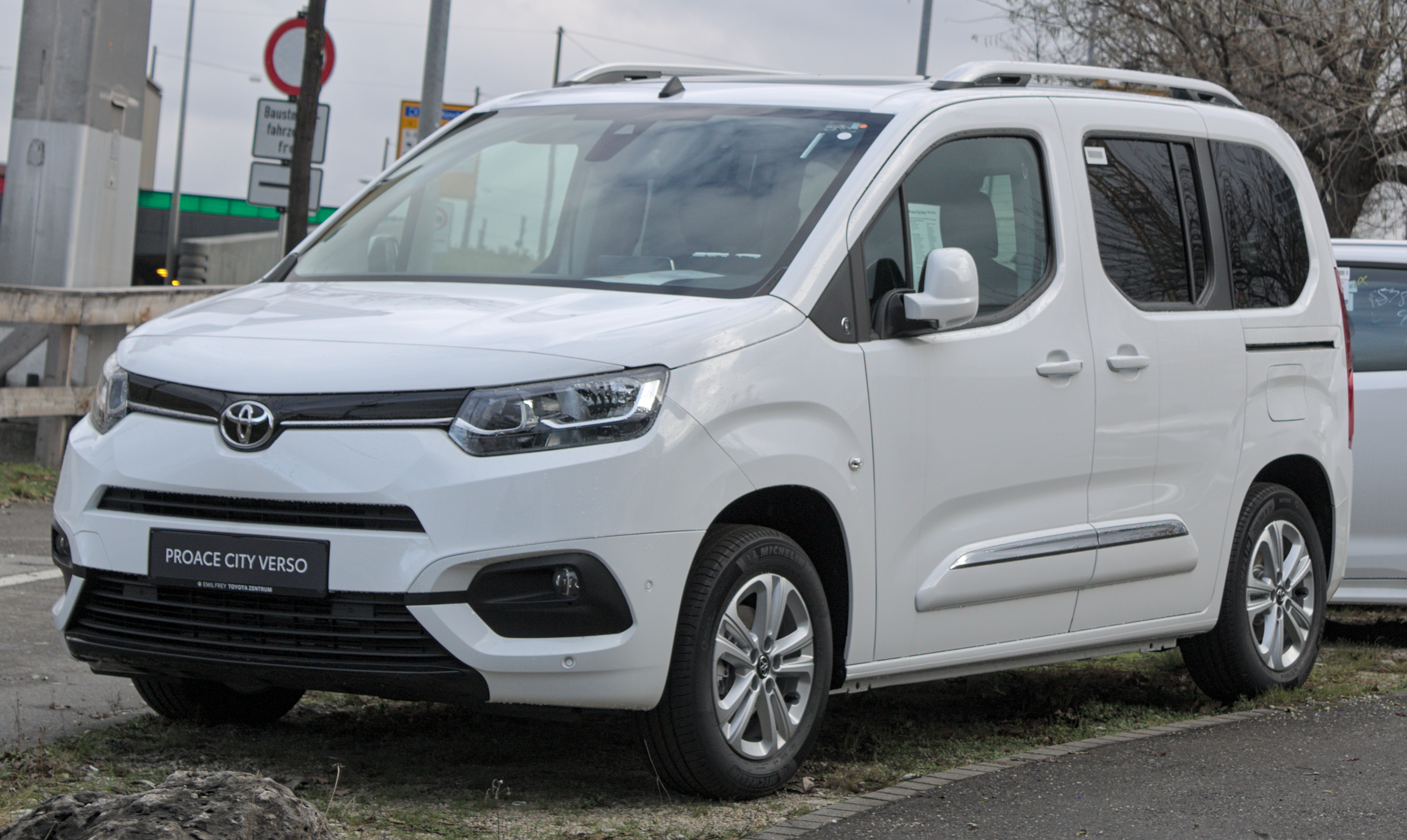
Toyota ProAce City Verso

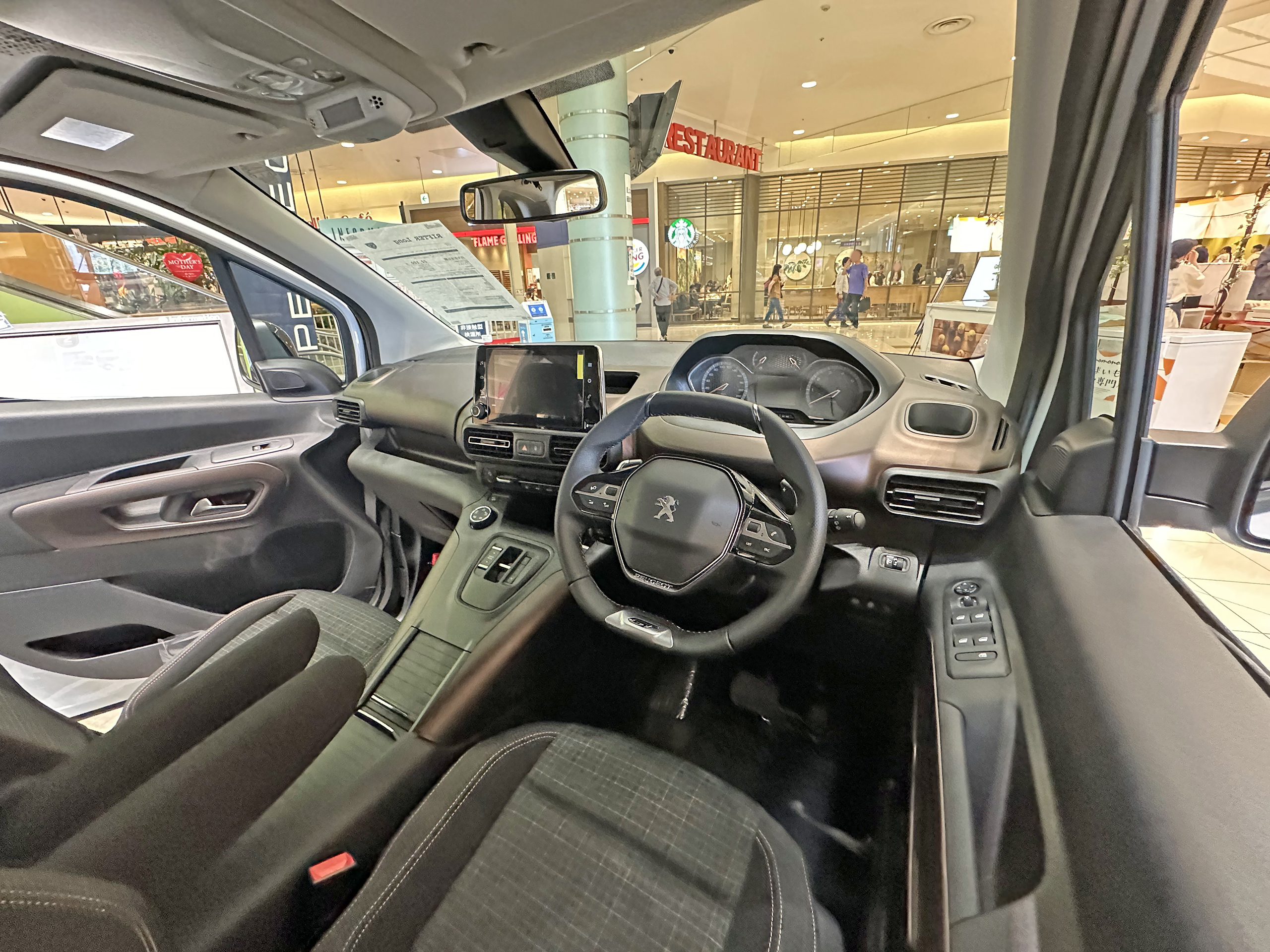
Interior (Peugeot Rifter) with the Peugeot iCockpit design

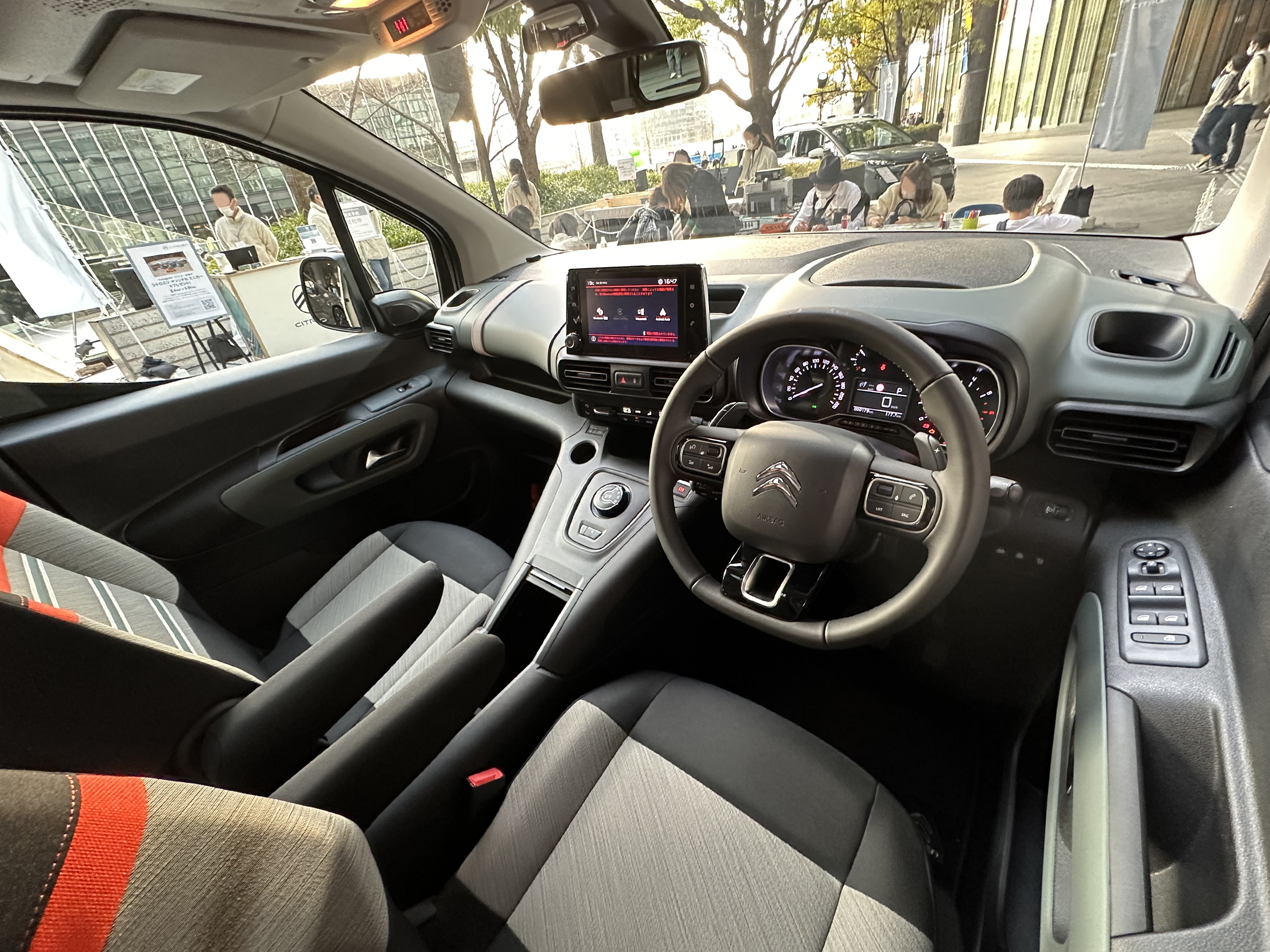
Interior (Citroën Berlingo)

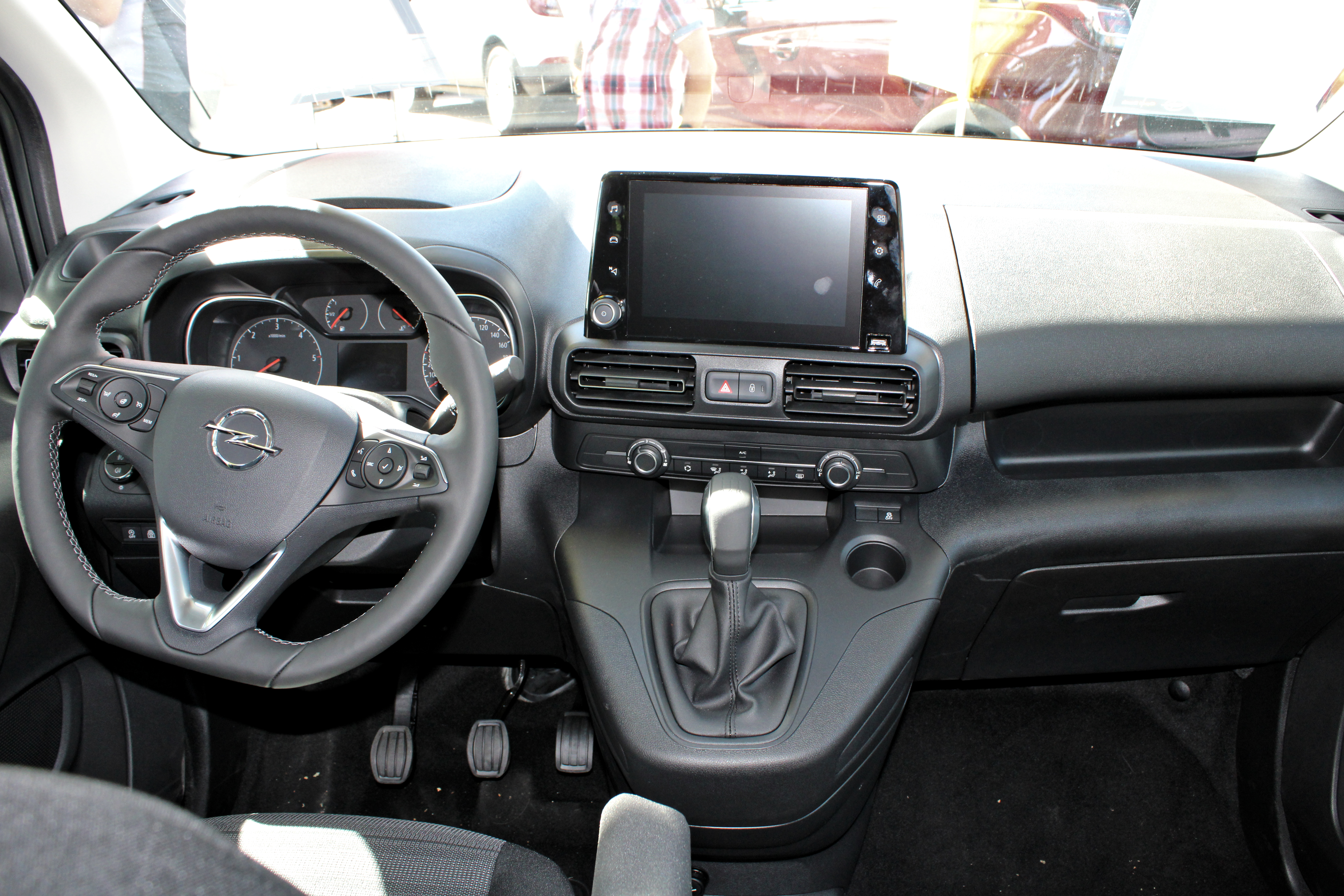
Interior (Opel Combo Life)

=== Facelift ===
A facelift was revealed on 23 October 2023, introducing technological updates. Engine on the european market are the 1.2 Turbo Puretec 110 HP and the two diesel 1.5 BlueHDi DV5 with 100 and 130 HP. A 1.2 Turbo Mild hybrid Euro 7 version with 122 HP is planned in the mid 2025.

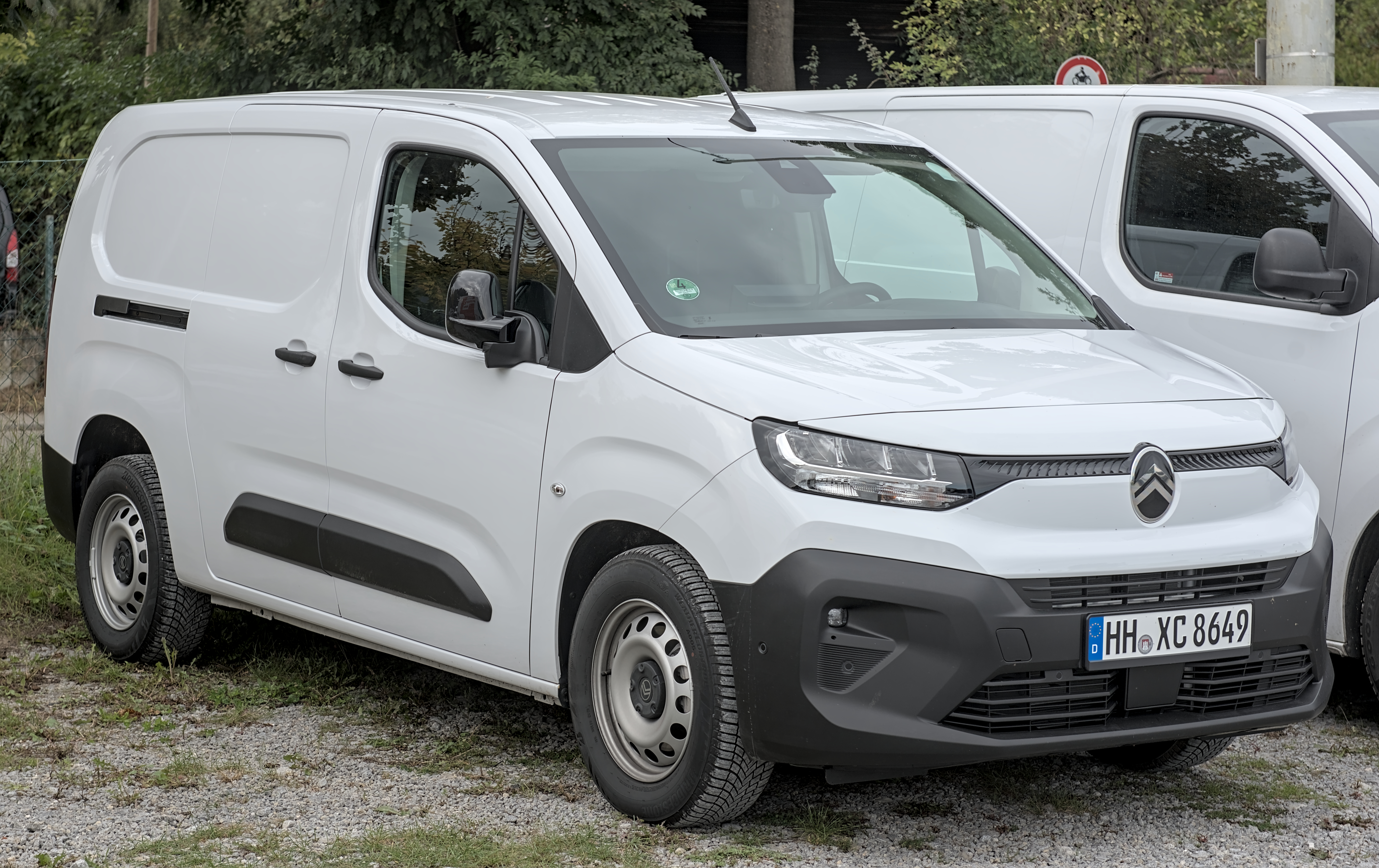
Citroën Berlingo Van (facelift)

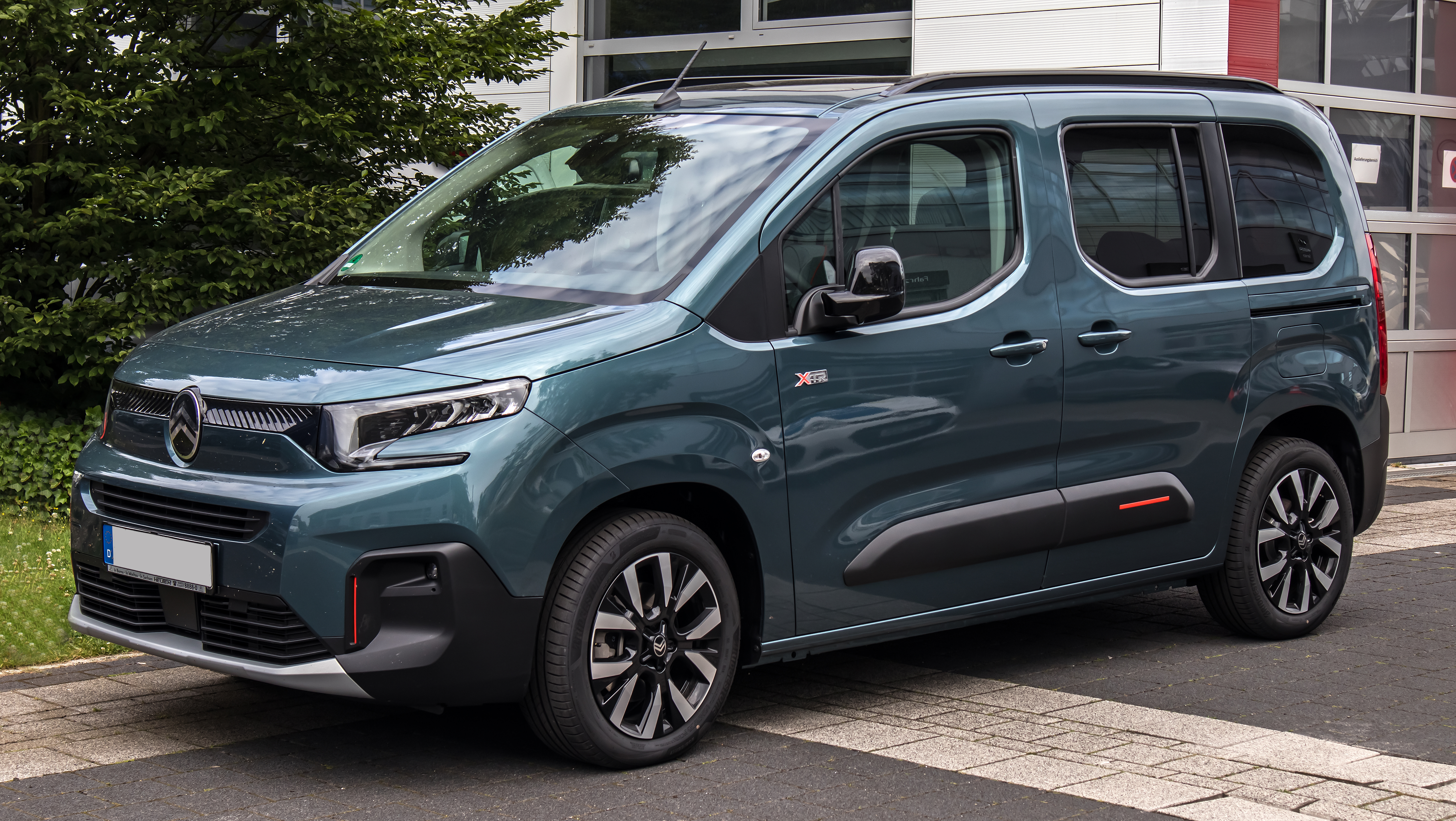
Citroën Berlingo (facelift)

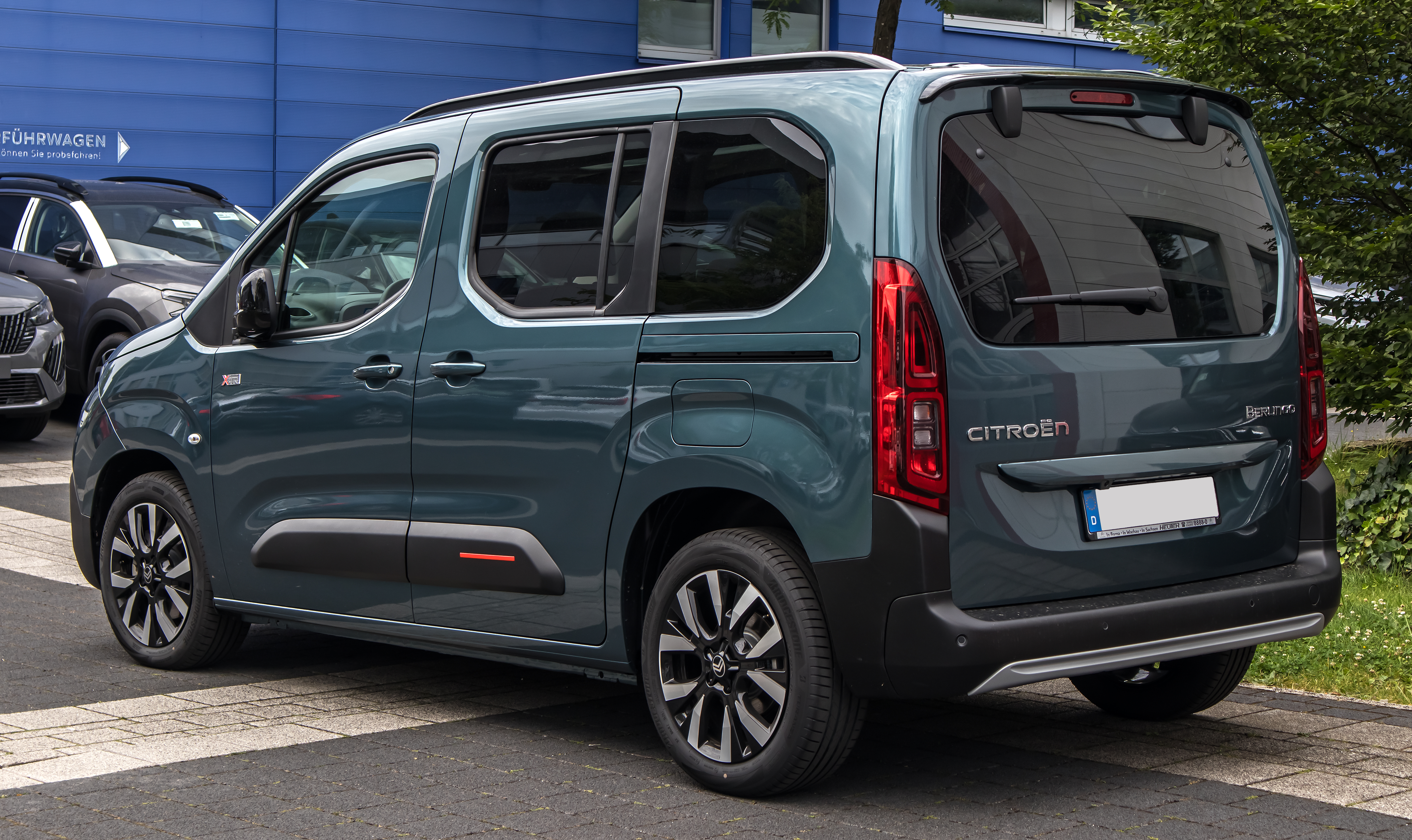
Citroën Berlingo (rear view)

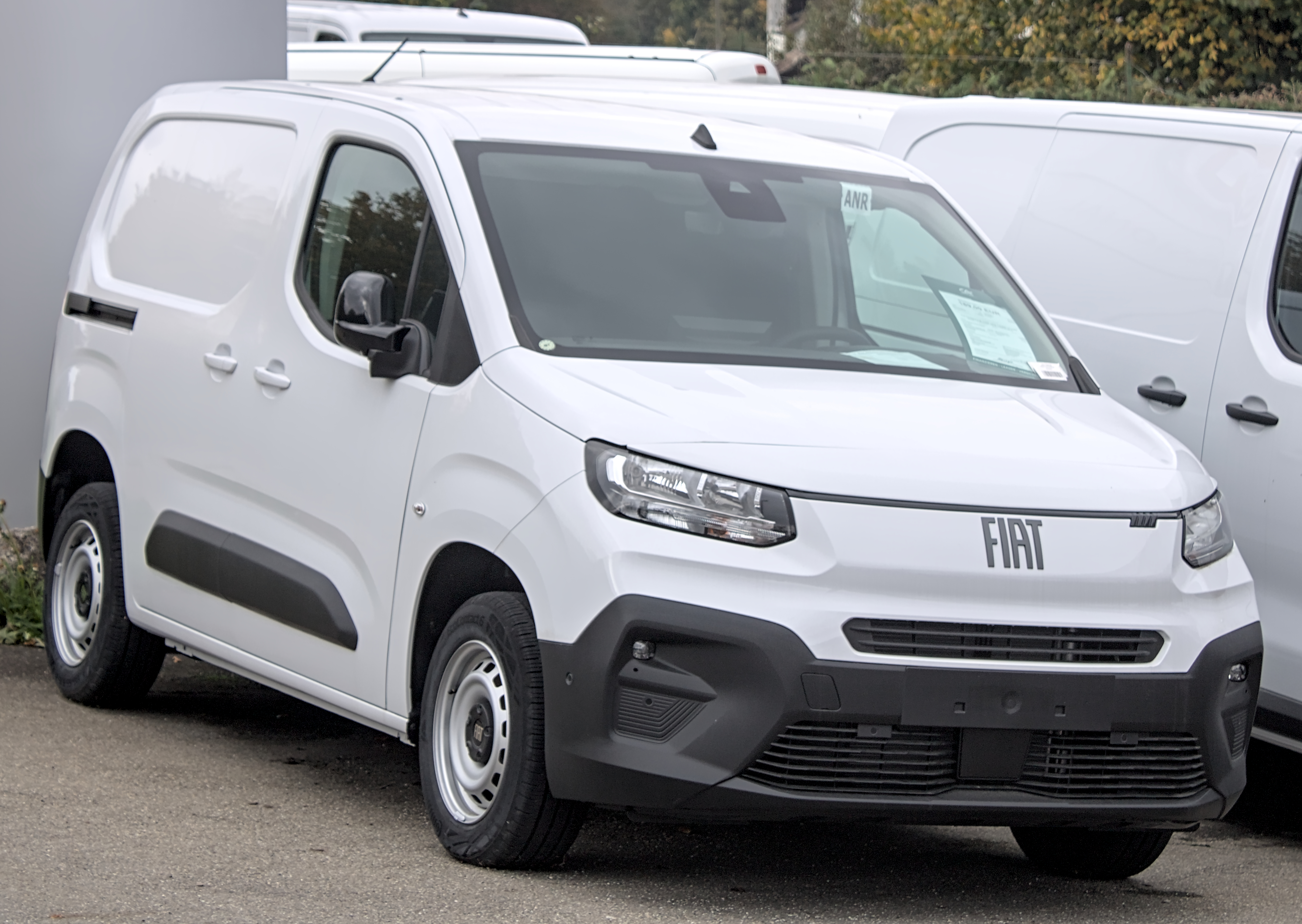
Fiat Doblò Van (facelift)

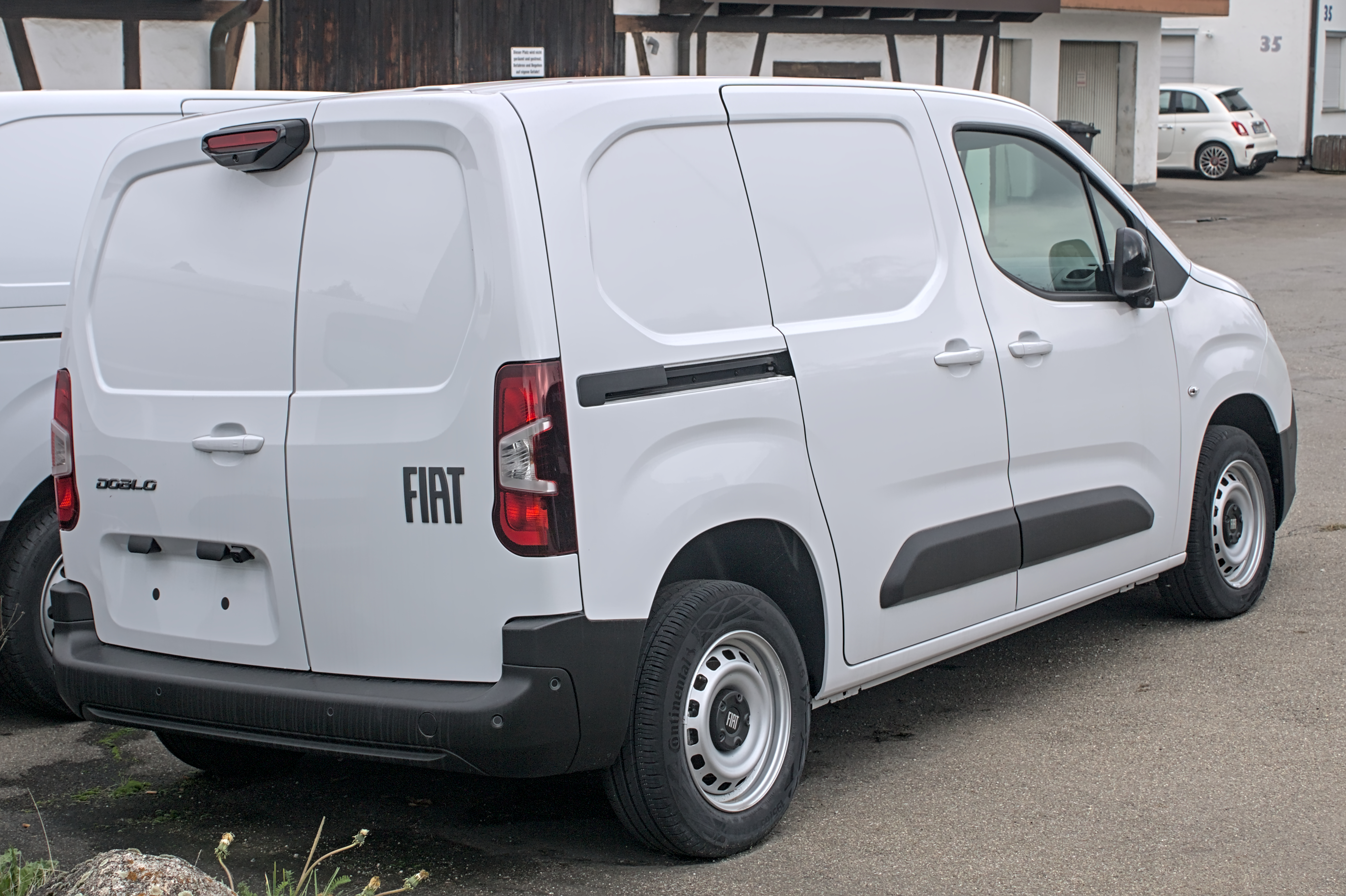
Fiat Doblò Van (rear view)

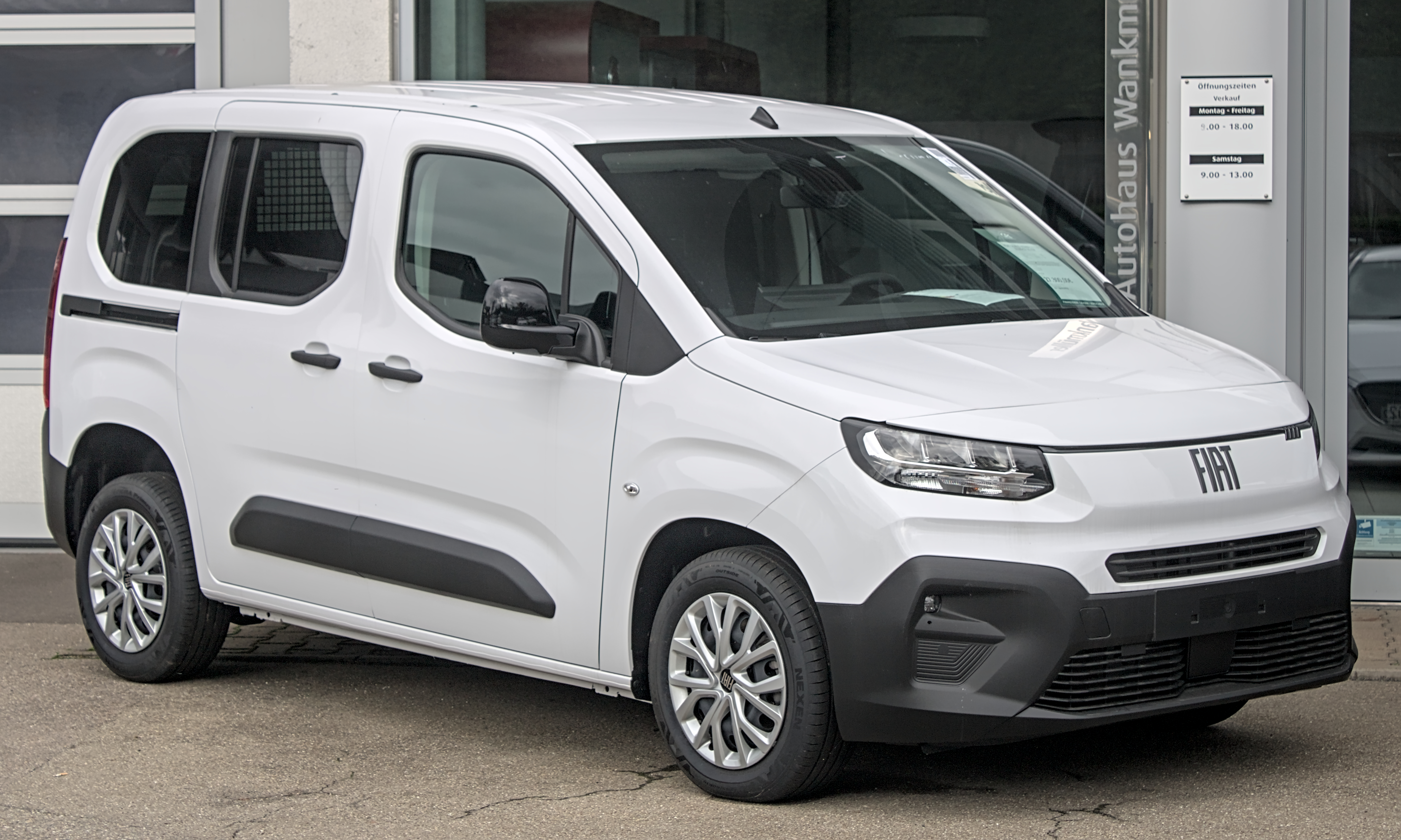
Fiat Doblò (facelift)

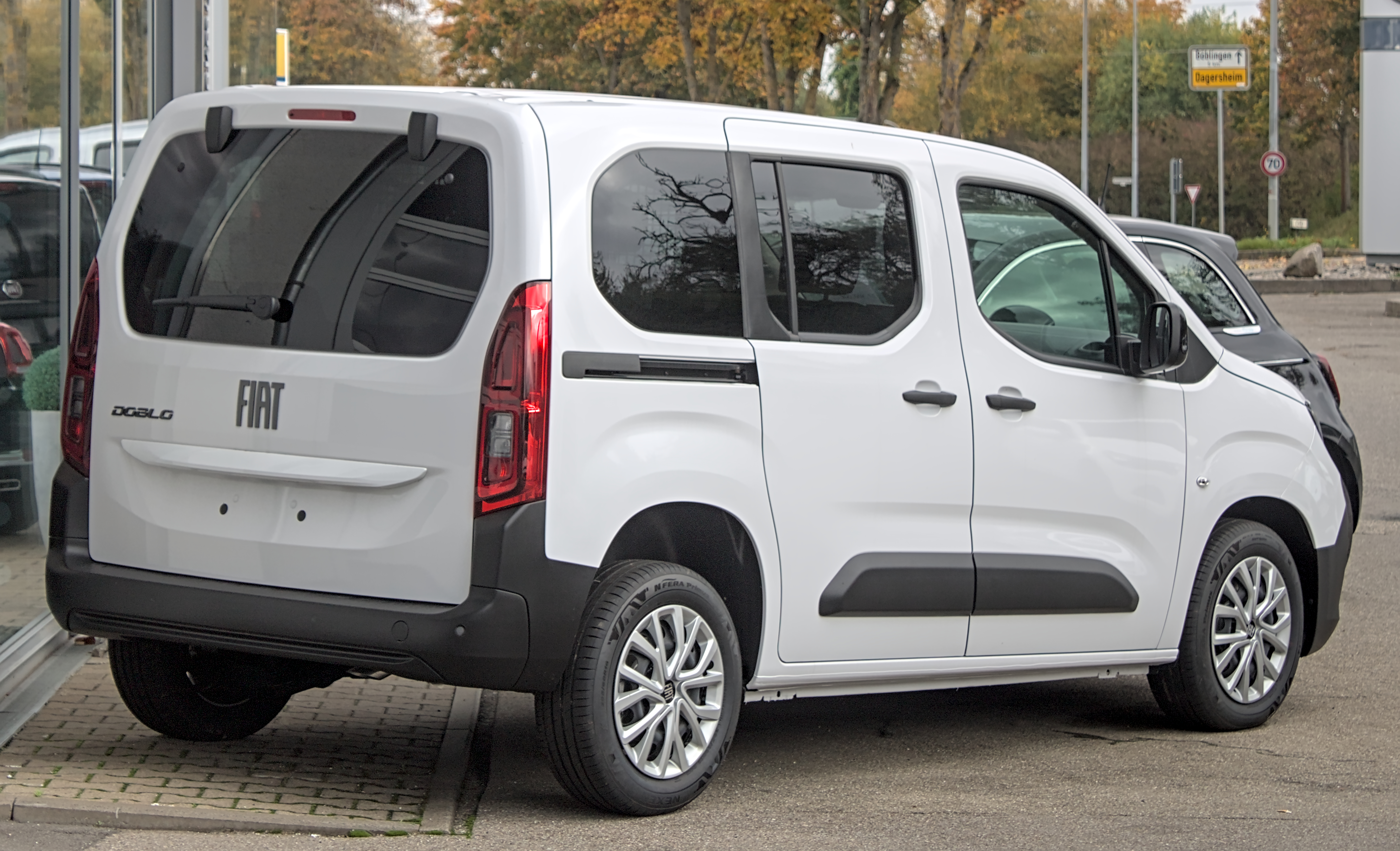
Fiat Doblò (rear view)

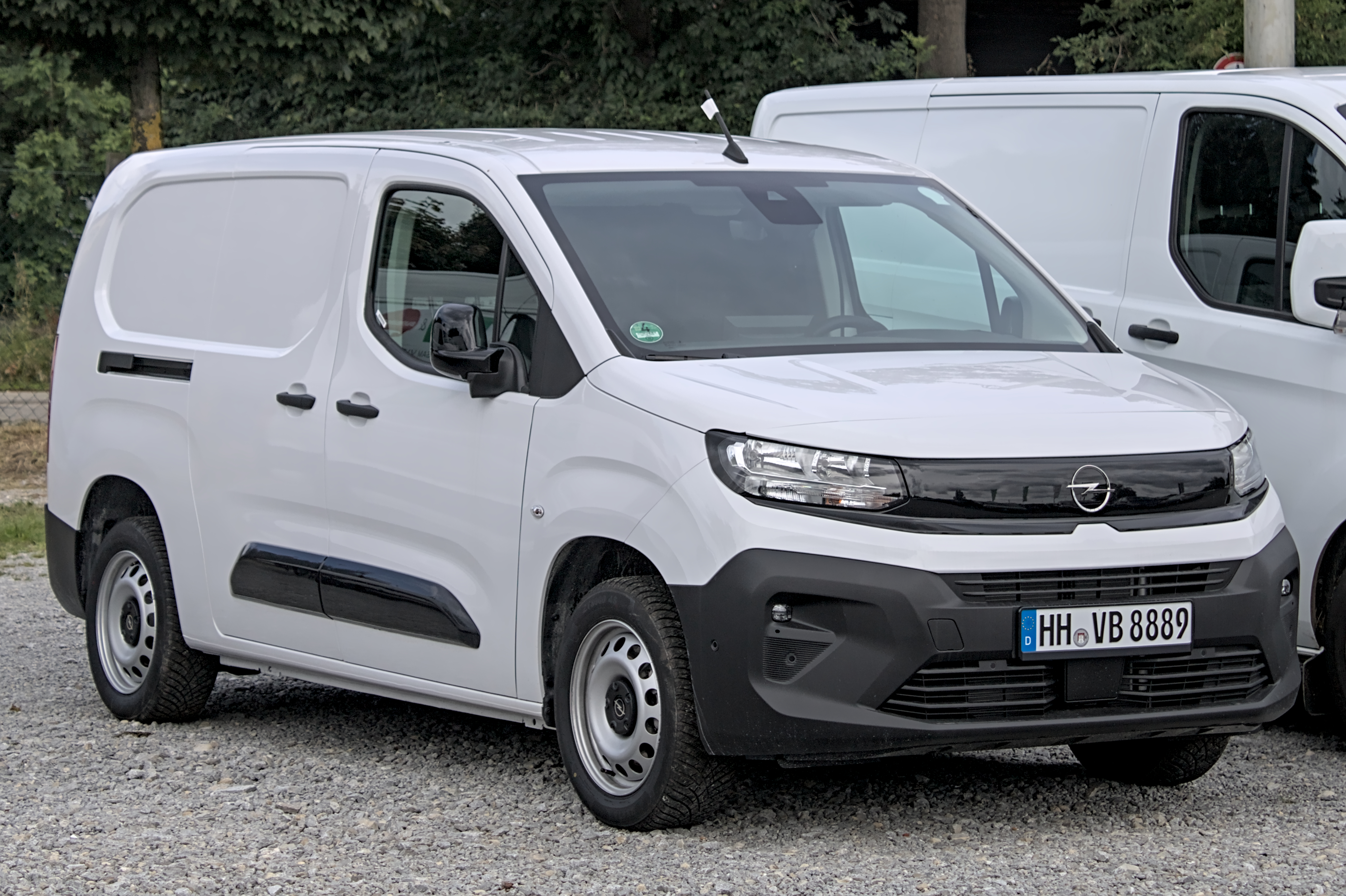
Opel Combo (facelift)

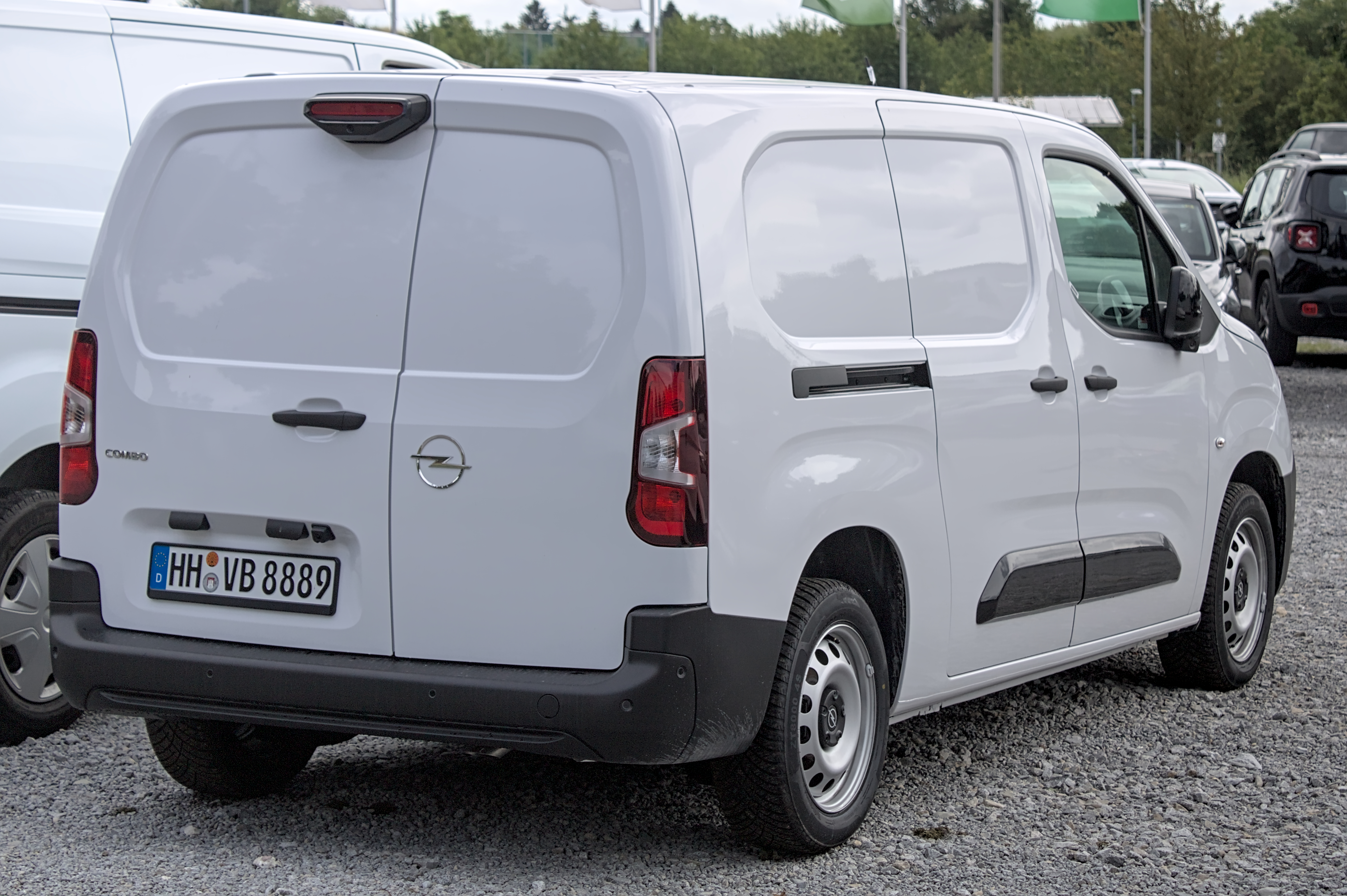
Opel Combo (rear view)

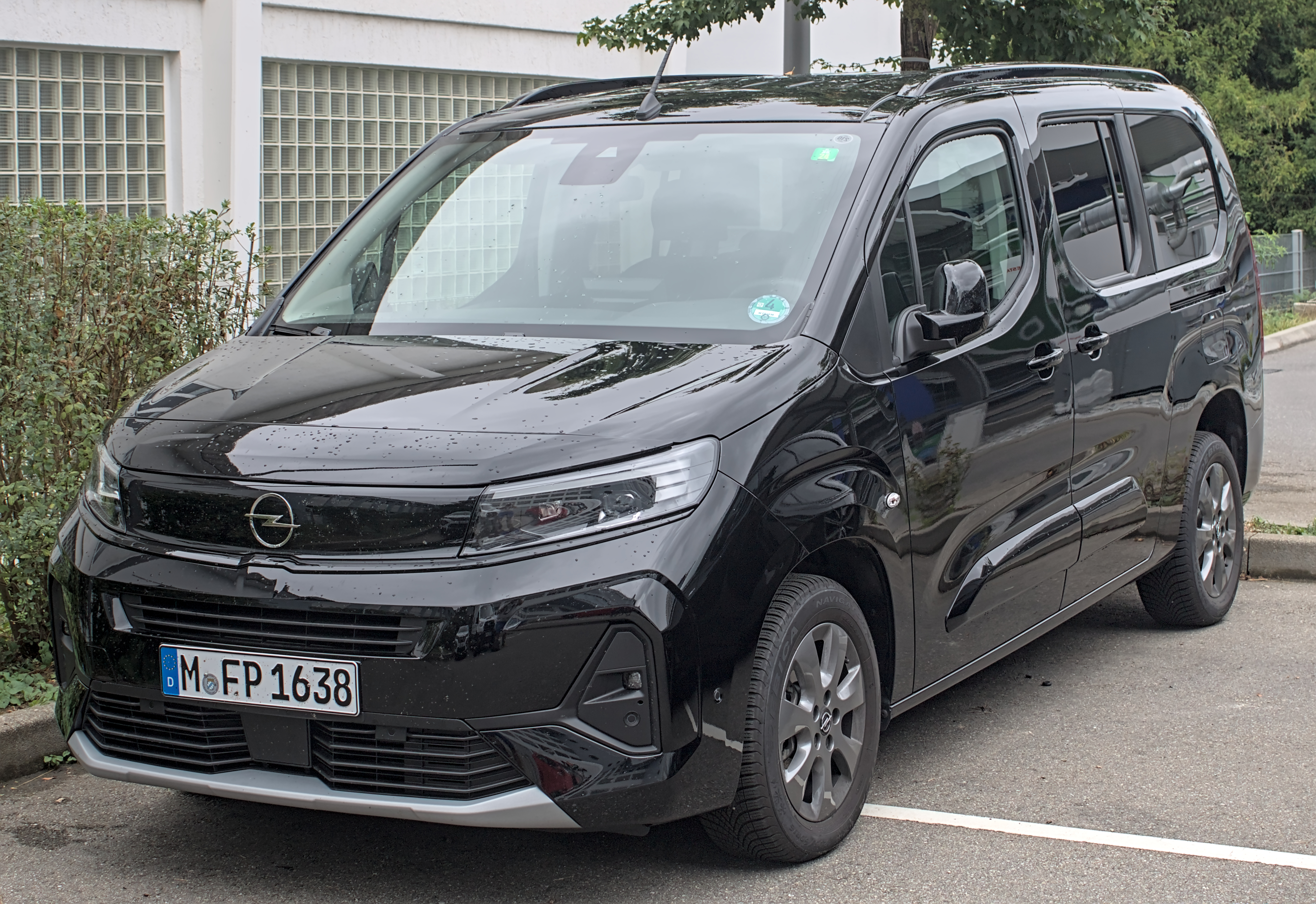
Opel Combo Life (facelift)

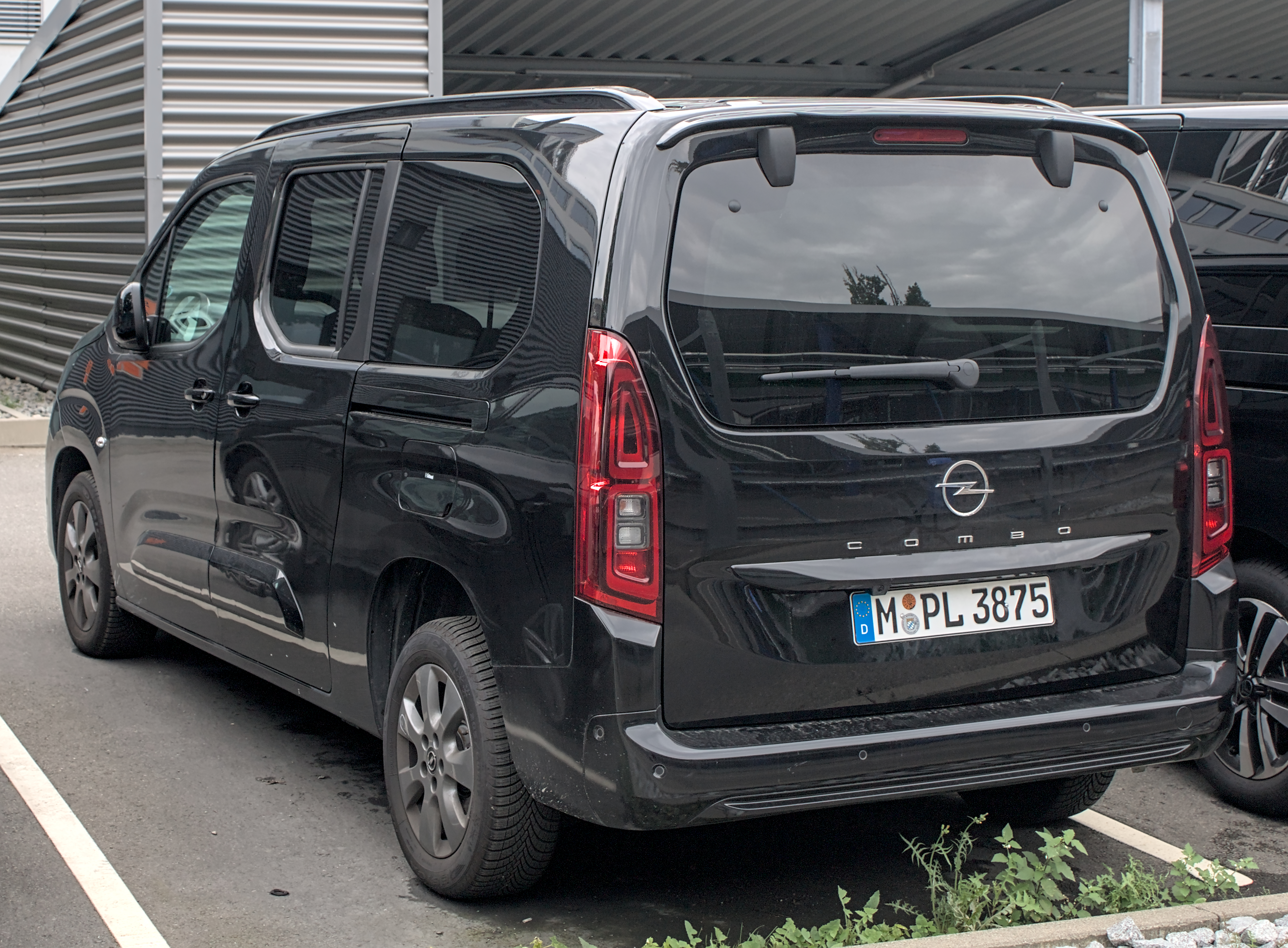
Opel Combo Life (rear view)

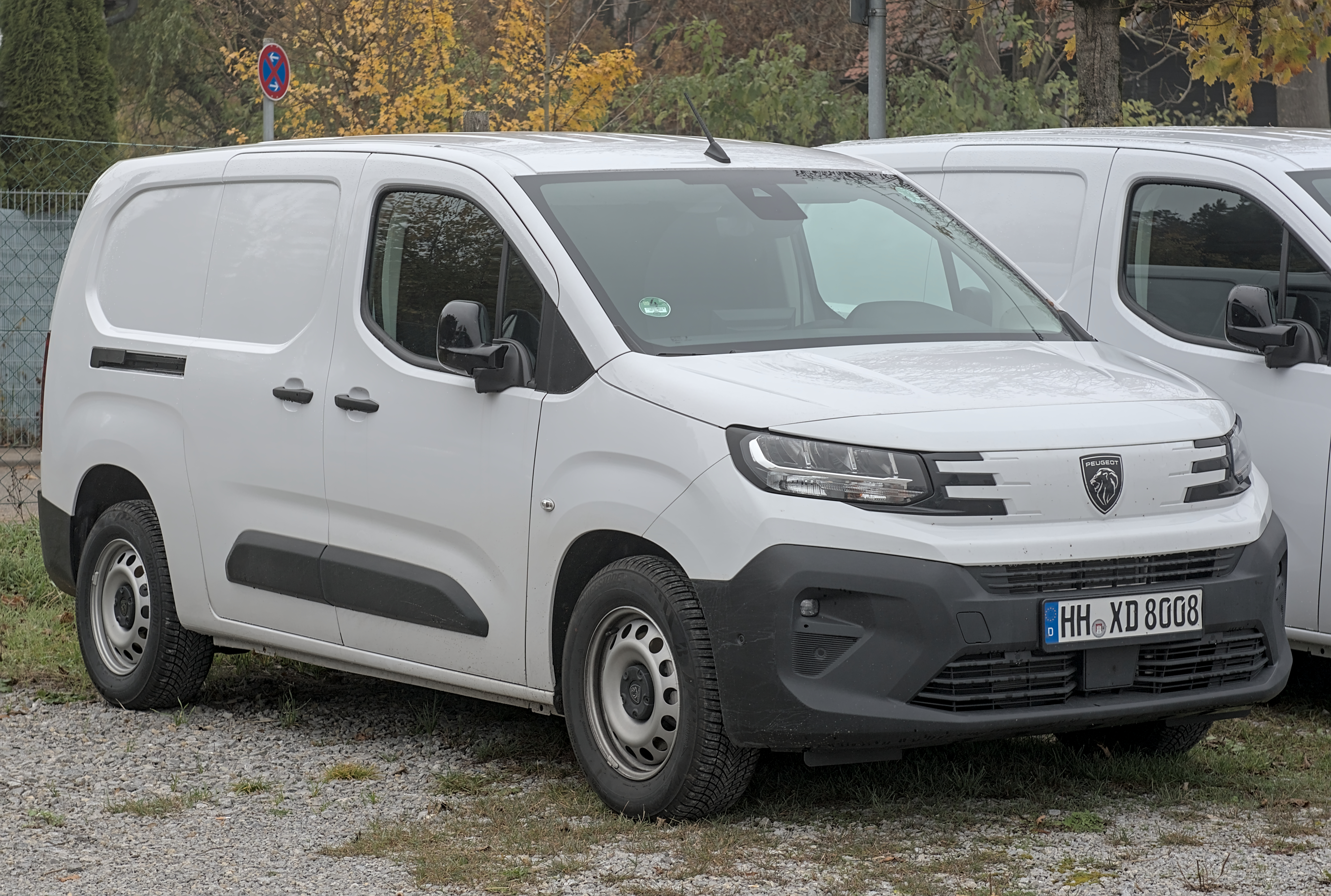
Peugeot Partner (facelift)

Peugeot Rifter (facelift)

Peugeot Rifter (rear view)

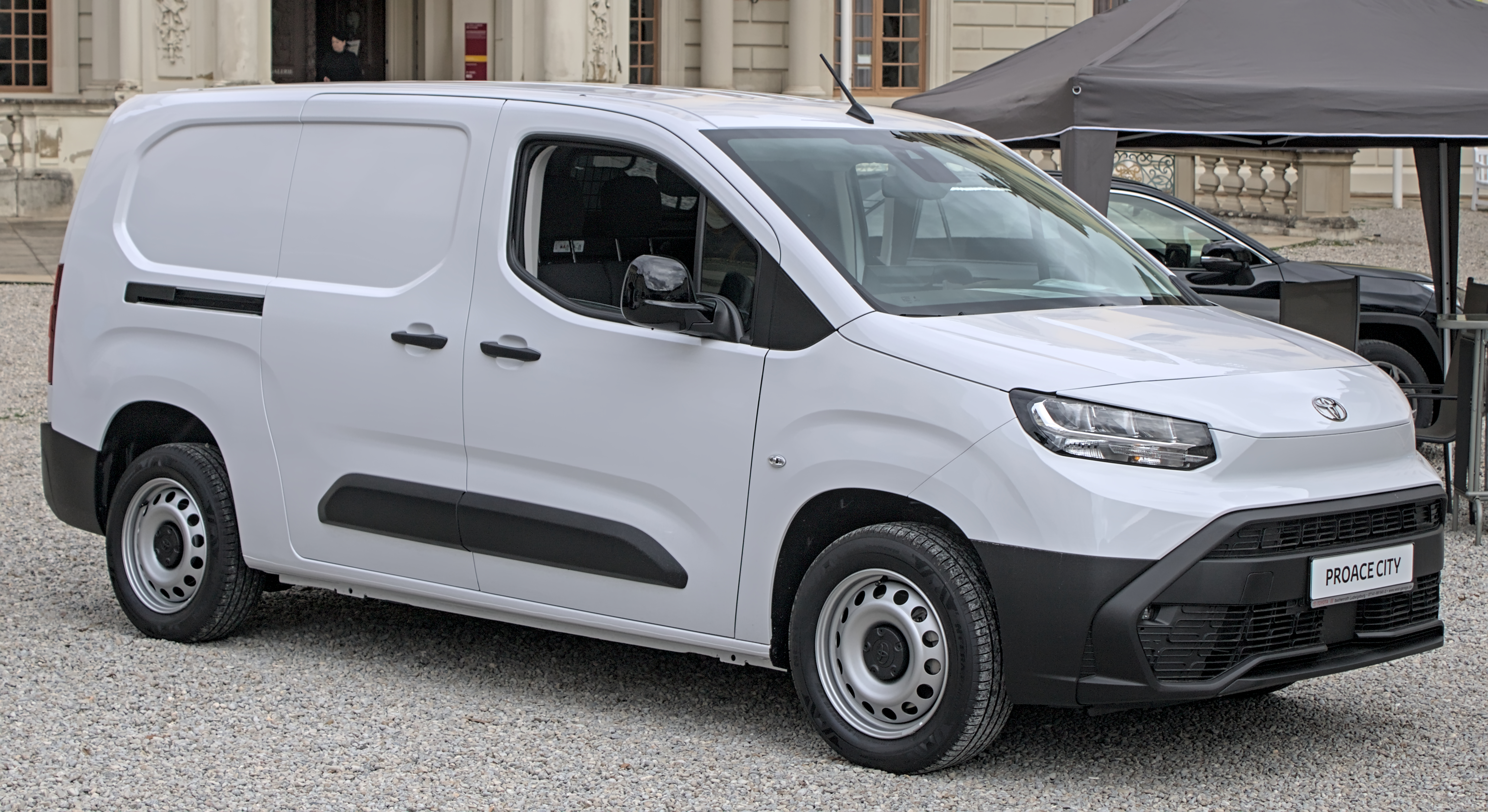
Toyota ProAce City (facelift)

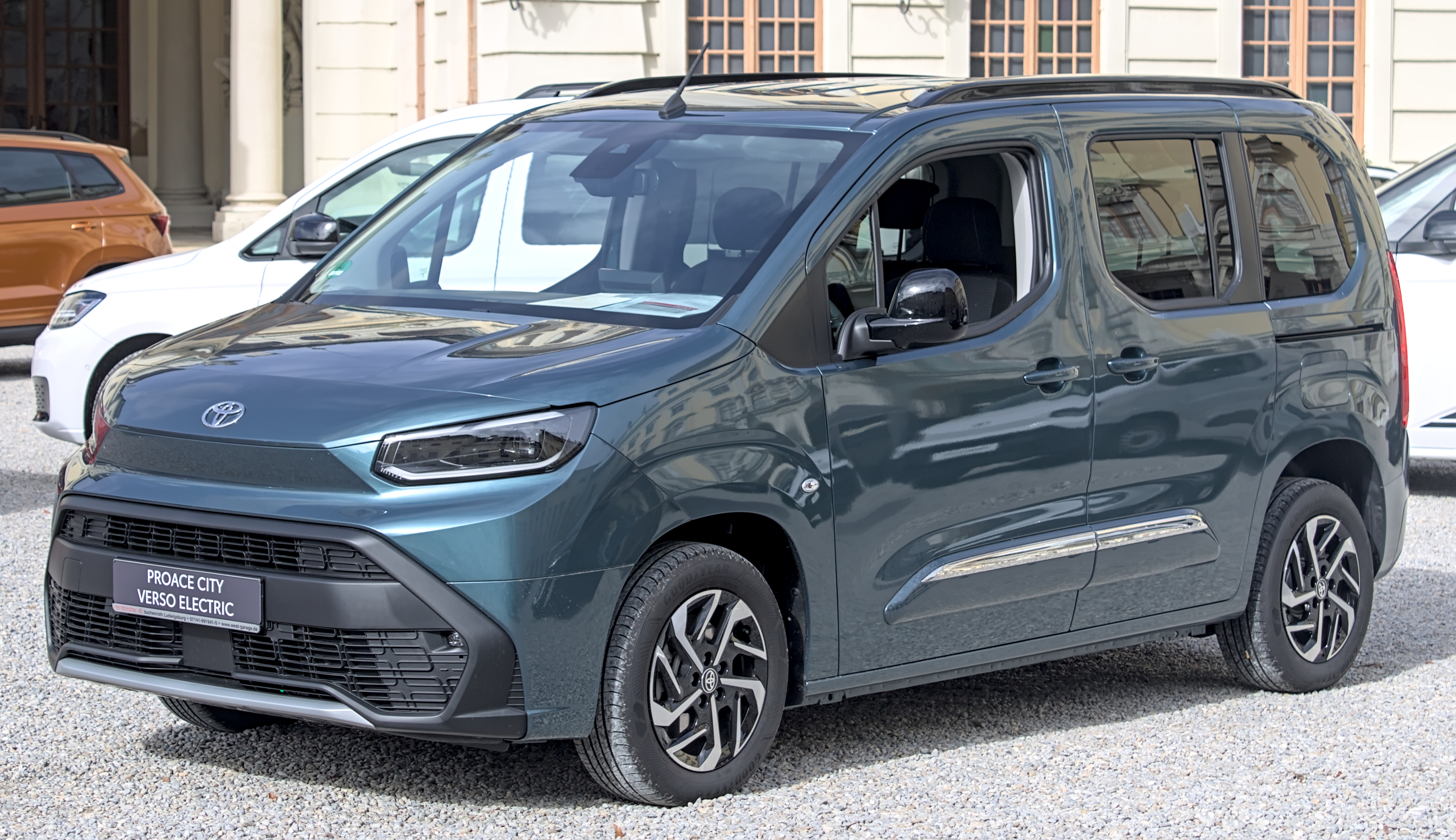
Toyota ProAce City Verso (facelift)

=== Safety ===
==== ANCAP ====
ANCAP test results* Peugeot Partner (2018, aligned with Euro NCAP)
Test	Points	%
Overall:	5 /5 stars	
Adult occupant:	34.2	90%
Child occupant:	N/A	N/A%
Pedestrian:	28.2	58%
Safety assist:	9.6	74%

==== Euro NCAP ====
Euro NCAP test results Citroën Berlingo (2025)
Test	Score
Overall:	4 /5 stars
Safe driving	73%
Crash avoidance	47%
Post crash	80%

Euro NCAP test results Fiat Doblo (2025)
Test	Score
Overall:	4 /5 stars
Safe driving	73%
Crash avoidance	47%
Post crash	80%

Euro NCAP test results Opel Combo (2025)
Test	Score
Overall:	3 /5 stars
Safe driving	73%
Crash avoidance	47%
Post crash	80%

Euro NCAP test results Peugeot Partner (2025)
Test	Score
Overall:	3 /5 stars
Safe driving	73%
Crash avoidance	47%
Post crash	80%

Euro NCAP test results Toyota Proace City (2025)
Test	Score
Overall:	4 /5 stars
Safe driving	73%
Crash avoidance	47%
Post crash	80%

== Worldwide sales and production ==
Year	Worldwide production		Worldwide sales		Notes
Year	Berlingo	Partner	Berlingo	Partner	Notes
2008	TBA	TBA	TBA	147,600	
2009	TBA	120,500	TBA	133,300	
2010	TBA	164,600	TBA	160,200	
2011	164,162	167,368	165,807	165,240	Total Berlingo production reached 2,448,214 units. Total Partner production reached 1,964,054 units.
2012	136,800	142,300	139,800	149,800	Total Berlingo production reached 2,585,000 units. Total Partner production reached 2,106,300 units.

== See also ==
- Berlin (carriage)
