= Tomos =

Slovenian motorcycle company

- Logos used by Tomos
- Type: Public
- Founded: July 1954
- Defunct: January 3, 2019
- Headquarters: Koper, Slovenia (formerly Yugoslavia)
- Products: Motorcycles & mopeds
- Website: http://www.tomos.si

Tomos (Slovene: Tovarna, Motornih koles, Sežana, "Motorcycle Factory Sežana") was a Slovene manufacturer of mopeds based in Koper. It was founded in 1948. Tomos acquired a production license from Puch to produce moped models under the Tomos name in 1954. Tomos had since produced various goods for the Central and Eastern European market, including motorcycles, mopeds, outboard motors and Citroën cars for the home market.

Tomos mopeds were also produced in Epe, Netherlands, starting in 1966. A very good-selling model was the Tomos "4L", produced from 1969 until 1980. The Dutch development team was responsible for the introduction of models like the Colibri, Targa and Revival. Tomos was the last remaining moped factory in the Netherlands, surviving at least 36 others since 1966. Tomos mopeds were sold in the U.S. from 1976 to 2014 and also exported to Canada. In 2017 Tomos was also selling mopeds in the United Kingdom.

Tomos went bankrupt on January 3, 2019. After 1991 on all products there was 'Made in Slovenia' label.

== History ==
=== Establishment ===
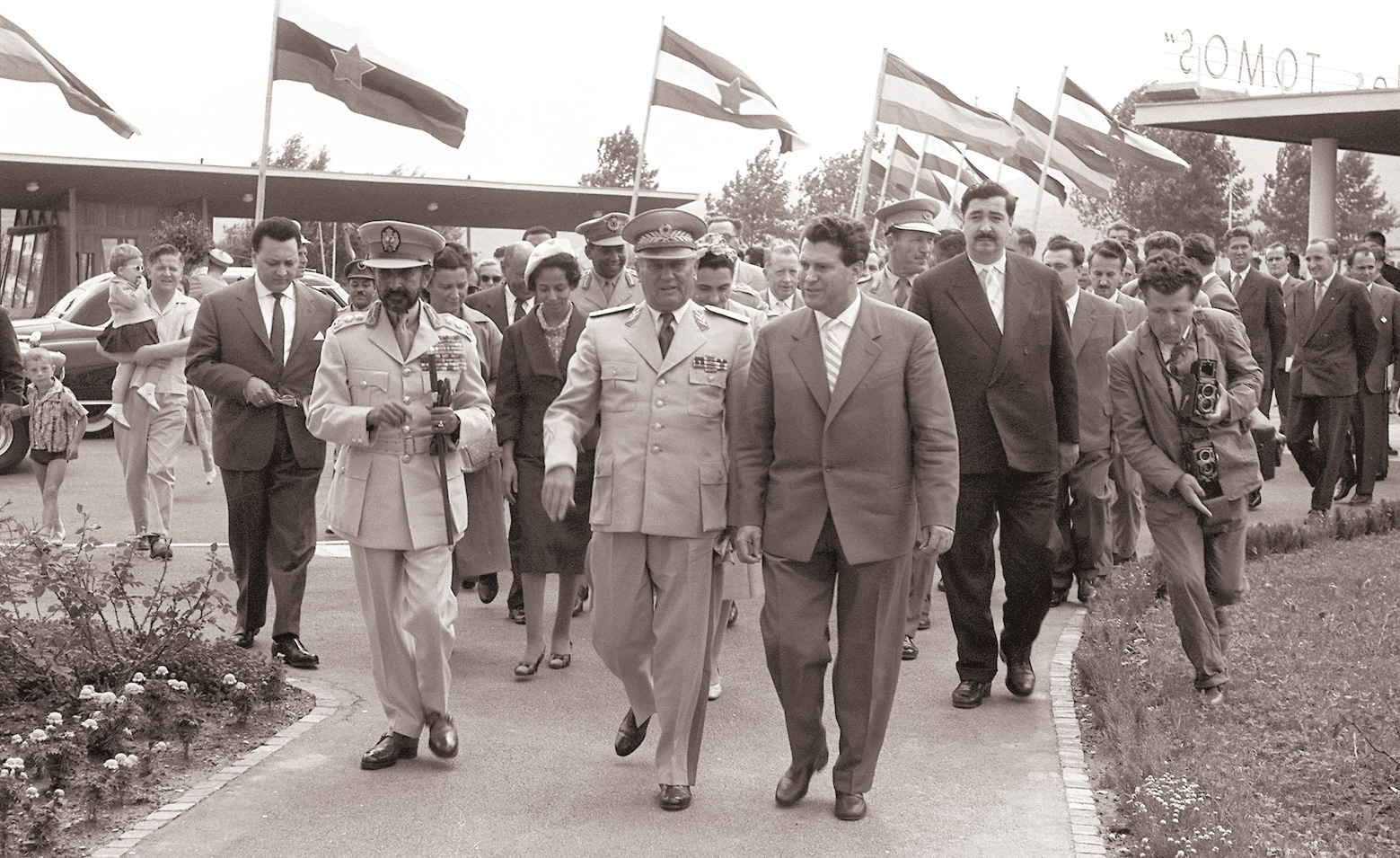
Josip Broz Tito and Ethiopian emperor Haile Selassie at Tomos factory - 1959

After World War II, the Yugoslav government sought to develop new industries. A company to produce two-wheelers was established in Sežana in July 1954, and soon a license agreement was signed with the Austrian company Steyr-Daimler-Puch. Puch had economical and robust motorcycles suitable for gravel roads and steep terrain characteristic of the region, and Puch also offered favorable licensing terms and conditions, as it doubted that the factory would ever be able to operate independently. The very next month, the name TOMOS (TOvarna MOtornih koles Sežana) appeared in the company documents for the first time. In October 1954, the Yugoslav government started to build the Tomos factory in Koper, the seaside industrial center of Slovenia. Production in temporary facilities started in 1955 and the factory was officially opened in 1959 by Josip Broz-Tito, the President of Yugoslavia.

Tomos remained a state-owned enterprise as Slovenia, with its close ties to Austria and Italy, was first to gain its independence as the Socialist Federal Republic of Yugoslavia broke up in the early 90s. The company navigated these challenges successfully and in 1998 it was privatized and sold to Hidria, a private Slovenian corporation.

=== License production - motorcycles ===
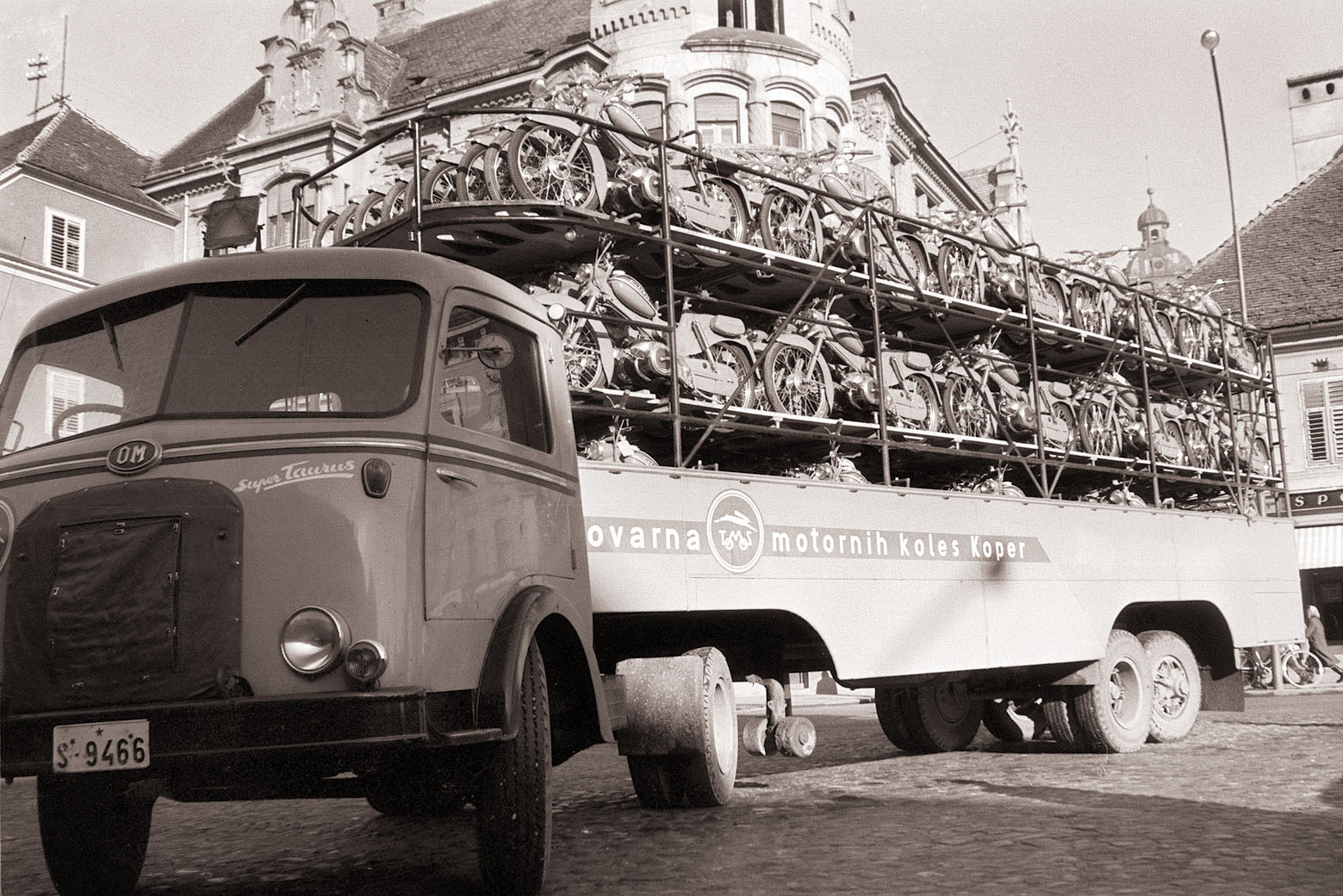
Delivering Tomos motorcycles - 1960

Tomos’s first product was a motorcycle called TOMOS Puch SG 250. In 1955 they made 137 of these motorcycles and assembled 124 RL 125 scooters and one hundred mopeds. The next year, mopeds accounted for the majority (1,712) of the total number of assembled units, followed by motorcycles (615) and scooters. Simultaneously with the licensed production, Tomos started development of its own serial models.

In the late 1950s, numerous variants of the moped Puch MS 50 were produced under the common name Colibri. The first Colibris were marked VS 50; later marks ranged from 01 to 013. Individual variants were adapted to foreign markets. In 1959, they produced more than 17,000 Colibris and signed a contract for the first major export to Sweden. Among the most successful Colibris was the type 12, while its version Colibri T 12, which was first presented in 1961 became the most popular moped in Slovenia.

In the early 1960s, market research showed that the interest in heavy motorcycles was decreasing all over Europe, and Tomos adapted its range of motorcycles and focused exclusively on the production of two-stroke 50cc motorcycles. In order to ensure systematic and organized development, the factory in 1962 organized its own Technical and Economic Research department.

The 1960s were the most productive period for Tomos. The Netherlands emerged as an important market in 1960. Tomos had so much success, that the only other plant outside of Slovenia was built in the Netherlands in 1966. Until 2009 the factory produced for the Dutch market along with research and development of new units. Tomos became the longest surviving moped factory in The Netherlands until production ended in 2009 due to the fact production- and labor costs are lower in Slovenia. The Netherlands remains the strongest market for Tomos today.

=== License production - automobiles ===
Beginning in 1959, Tomos began producing Citroën automobiles under license at the Koper plant, and selling them in the Yugoslav market. The Yugoslav automobile market was closed, so this joint venture with a local firm allowed Citroën to access the market.

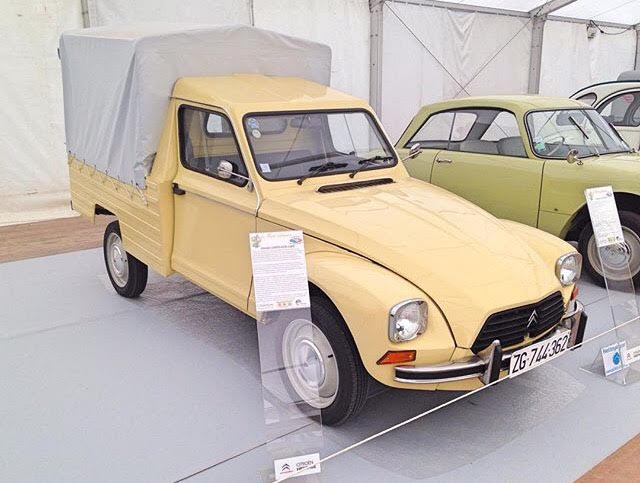
Cimos Geri

In 1972 Tomos, Iskra, and Citroën formed a new company, Cimos (Citroën, Iskra, Tomos), for the manufacture and export of cars and car sub-assemblies. Iskra was a manufacturer of automotive components, especially generators.

Cimos was half owned by Citroën and half by the Yugoslav government. The Yugoslav government was short of hard currency and often used the barter system, paying Citroën with cereals and raw materials, which Citroën resold in Western Europe.

Locally made vehicles included the Ami 8, 2CV6, GS, and Citroën Dyane (called the Diana). Cimos also sold imported vehicles, the CX and Méhari. The Cimos GS can be distinguished by round headlights, developed for the US market but never used there.

In 1981, Cimos began to produce a specific model, the Dak, an enclosed cargo utility vehicle, very similar to the fourgonette. The basis was an unstretched Diana chassis, unlike the French Acadiane which was based on the longer chassis of the 2CV AK400. Cimos also prepared a pick up truck from the same basis, the Geri. Sales were 2,200 Dak and 900 Geri. Citroën did not allow Cimos to export these utility vehicles, and this rift led to the French firm ceasing delivery of parts to its Yugoslav partner by 1985, dooming the joint venture.

=== Own-design motorcycles - automatics ===
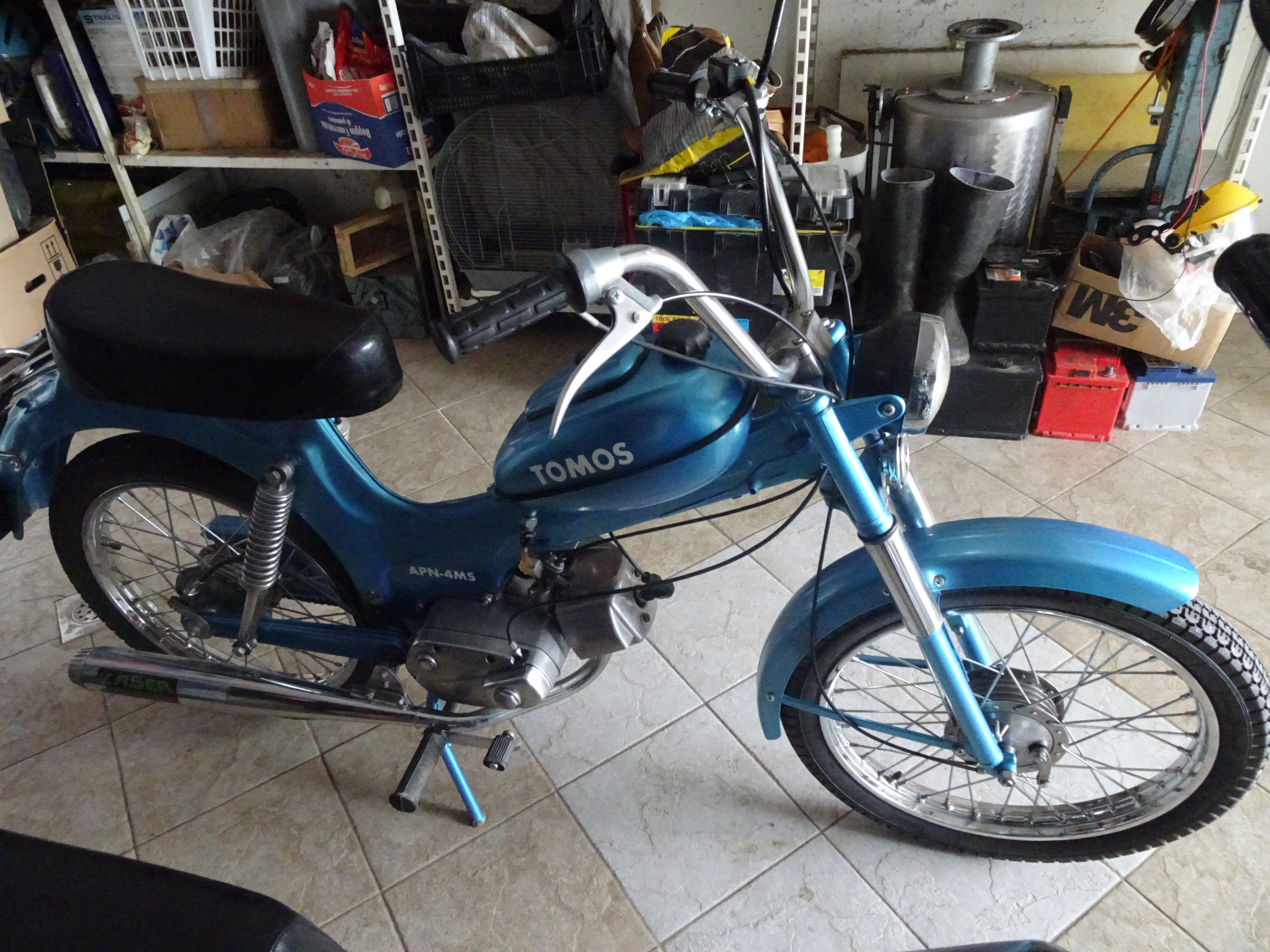
Tomos APN-4MS

At the brink of the 1970s, Tomos started preparing for the production of "automatics" of its own design, as the market was increasingly interested in such type of motorcycles and the components produced abroad were more and more expensive. Therefore, they produced Automatic A1 with improved single gear engine which was built into the framework structure of the previous Automatic. Its successor, Automatic A3 was made in 1973 when they launched the new, modernized production line with automated machines for framework welding. This was the beginning of the production of new frameworks in Tomos which were visually different from the licensed Puch's motorcycle frameworks.

As the standard of living increased significantly in the 1970s, the number of young buyers also grew. These were attracted by automatics and mopeds of the type A-OS, A-ON and APN. The latter type was particularly popular among the young, which is why Tomos started producing special variants of these mopeds with raised handlebars, seat with back support, side bags and a lot of chrome.

In the 1970s, several new models of Colibris were sent to the markets. Colibris T-03, T-12 and T-13 had Puch's motors while Colibri 14V had inbuilt motor produced by Tomos, according to its own design. After 1973 all motorcycles and bicycles with motors attached produced by Tomos were equipped with in-house manufactured engines. In this period, they also developed Colibri 15 with a stronger motor which could almost compete with motorcycles.

=== Oil crisis and modernization ===
In the 1960s and 1970s Tomos' developmental activity reached its peak in terms of the volume of patents and prototypes. However, during the 1979–1980 time frame Tomos was faced with restrictive environmental standards for the first time. In the 1980s, Tomos modernized the entire range of two-wheelers and concentrated on reducing the level of noise and harmful emissions, and increased the rider's comfort along with a more modern look.

1976 saw the debut of Tomos in the United States of America through US distributors. There were many European manufacturers who had mopeds in the USA market. The market hit its zenith in 1979 as gas prices were at a premium and shortages were common due to a change in OPEC policy. People started to rethink their consumption of gasoline and looked to more efficient means. The moped surfaced as that alternative reaching over 100 mpg.

The entire range of two-wheelers was again competing globally after the modernization in the 1980s. The first product from this new range was APN 6 which was introduced in 1981. In 1985, TOMOS launched a new generation of motorcycles, the BT 50 with cast wheels and turn signals. Based on this model, TOMOS ATX 50 C was produced later for off-road use.

=== 1990s ===
In the 1990s Tomos came out with the Sprint, Targa, and Targa LX. The later two were eventually changed to TOMOS ST and TOMOS LX. A new engine was introduced called the A35. Tomos USA was started in Spartanburg, South Carolina, in a new office and warehouse complex of over 24,000 sq ft (2,200 m^{2}).

=== 2000s ===
In 2006 the A35 engine was replaced with the A55. This new engine featured lighter weight rotating parts as well as better power output. This engine is currently used on all 50cc applications.

In 2004, Slovenia was admitted into the European Union and a contract was signed with Germany's BMW to produce component parts for some of its units, that production continues today from Koper. New models introduced during these years such as the MC Off-Road Line, Revival, Streetmate, and Arrow. Complementing these new units was a new family engine called the A55 in 2006, meeting stricter EPA emission standards.

=== 2010s ===
Tomos returned to the US market with two new mopeds, the redesigned Sprint with classic details, and the all-new Racing TT, but went bankrupt in 2019.

== Products ==
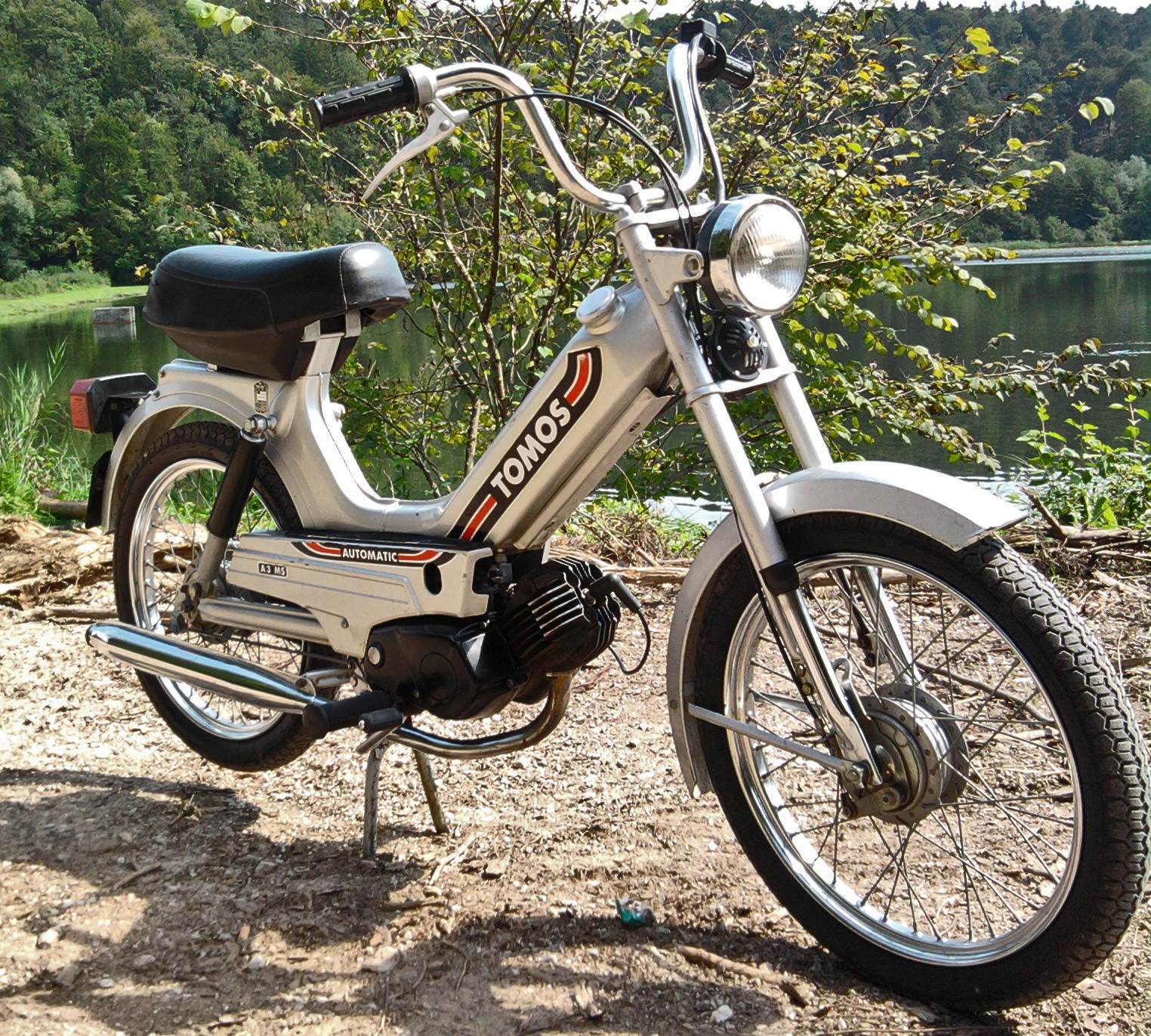
Tomos Automatic

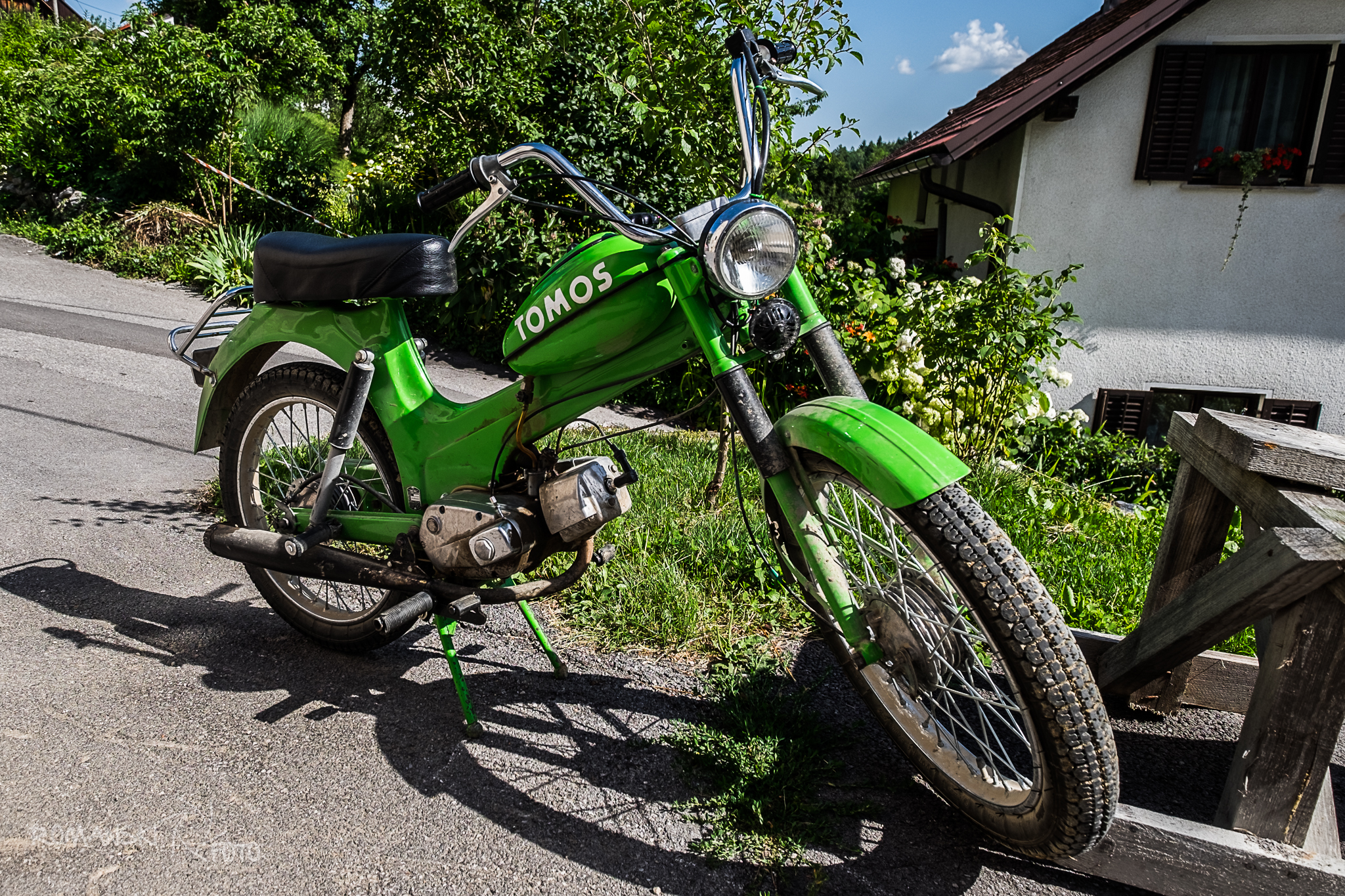
Tomos APN 4

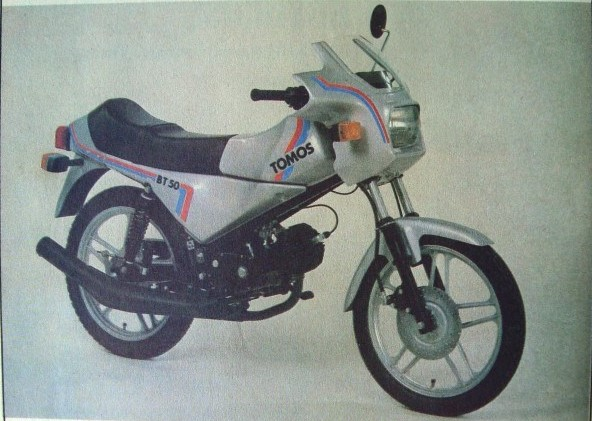
Tomos BT 50

- Tomos CTX 80
- Tomos ATX 50
- Tomos BT 50
- Tomos AT 50 NL/UK Market
- Tomos TS 50
- Tomos NTX 50 (Netherlands only)
- Tomos Flexer / Sport'R
- Tomos Racing TT
- Tomos Streetmate and Streetmate R
- Tomos Arrow and Arrow R (Youngster)
- Tomos Roadie
- Tomos Revival
- Tomos ST and Sprint (step-through models)
- Tomos LX (top-tank model)
- Tomos Colibri 15SLH
- Tomos Classic (Japan only)
- Tomos SGS 250
- Tomos Electronic E90
- Tomos Sprint Electronic
- Tomos APN-4MS
- Tomos APN-6 Alpino
- Tomos Tori Cross
- Tomos a3
- Tomos a3m
- Tomos a3ms
- Tomos S1 (Netherlands only)
- Tomos APN 4
- Tomos APN 4H (hippy)
- Tomos APN 6
- Tomos APN 6s
- Tomos 14 M
- Tomos Automatic
- Tomos LX
- Tomos Quadro
- Tomos Wizard
- Tomos 2L
- Tomos 3L
- Tomos 4L
- Tomos 4LT
- Tomos XL45 Classic (UK market)
- Tomos ATX 50
- Tomos Luxe
- Tomos Funtastic / Fun sport
- Tomos Pack'R
- Tomos Youngst'R
- Tomos Taxxity
- Tomos Standaard (NL)

=== Supermoto ===
- Tomos SE 125 F
- Tomos SM 125 Replica Cup
- Tomos Norton TN 750 Fastback 745 cm3

=== Outboard motors ===
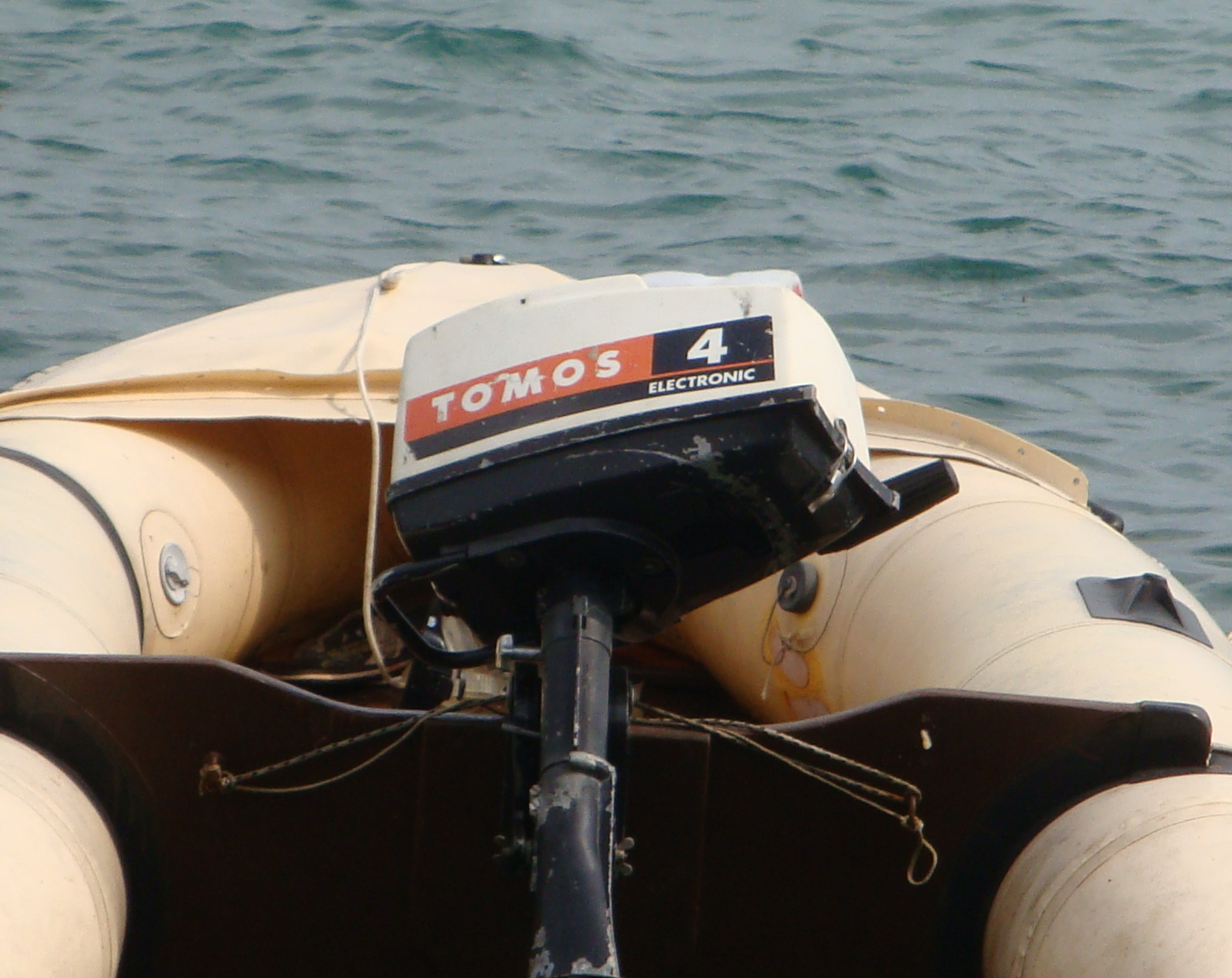
Tomos 4

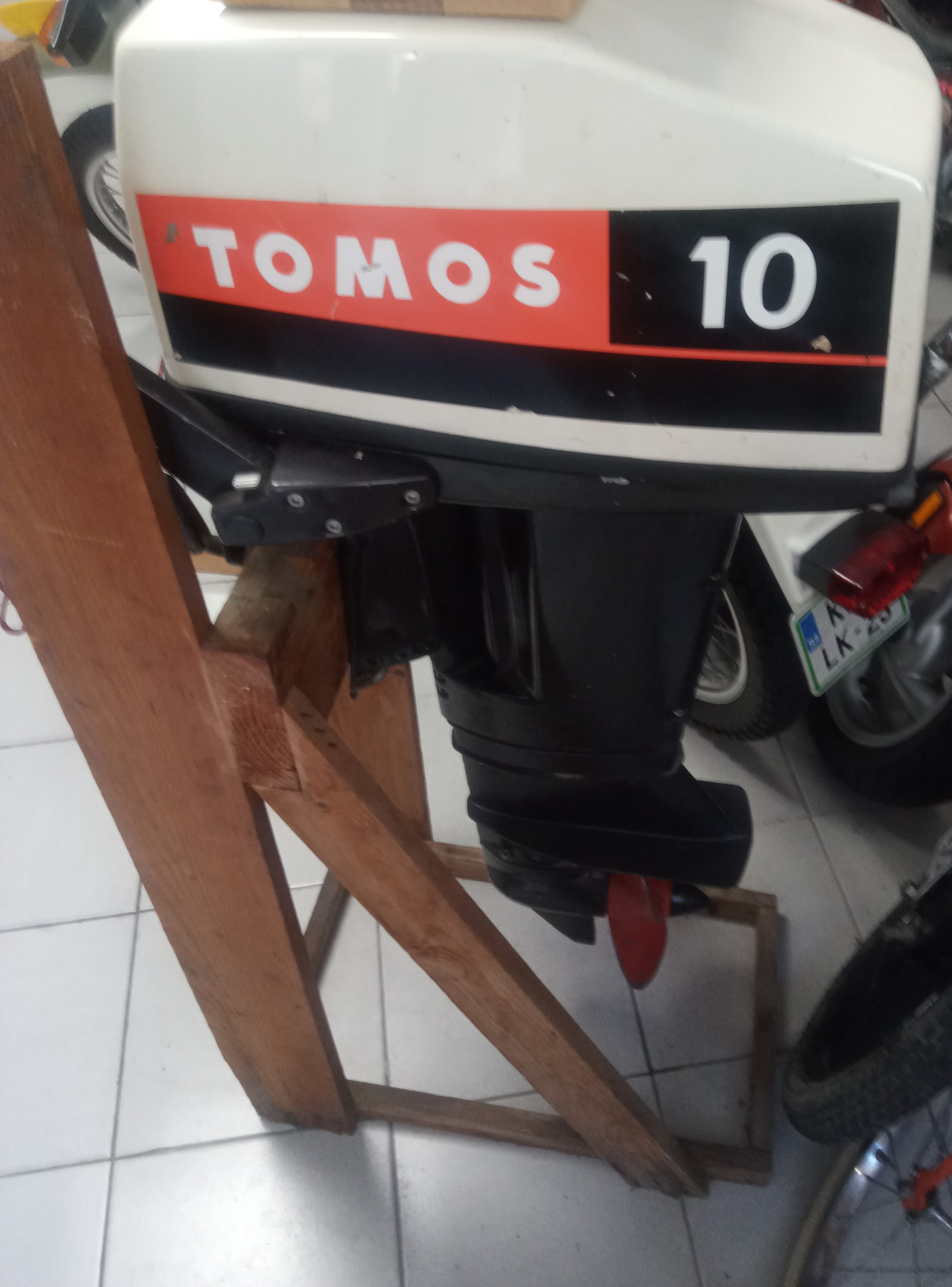
Tomos 10

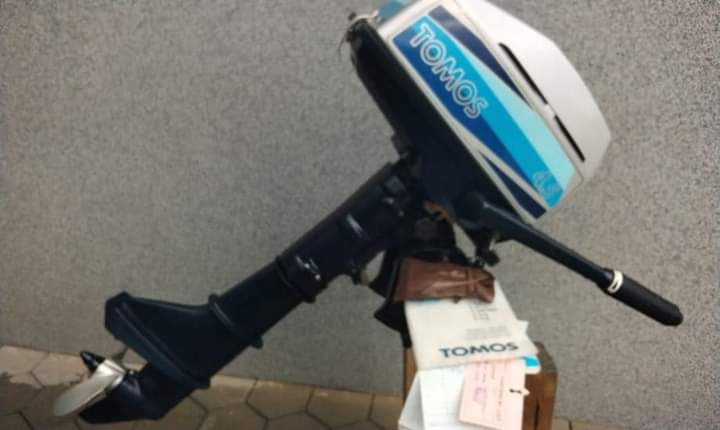
Tomos 4.5 - last livery

- Tomos 3.5
- Tomos 4
- Tomos 4.5
- Tomos 4.8
- Tomos 9.9
- Tomos 10
- Tomos 18

=== Cars ===
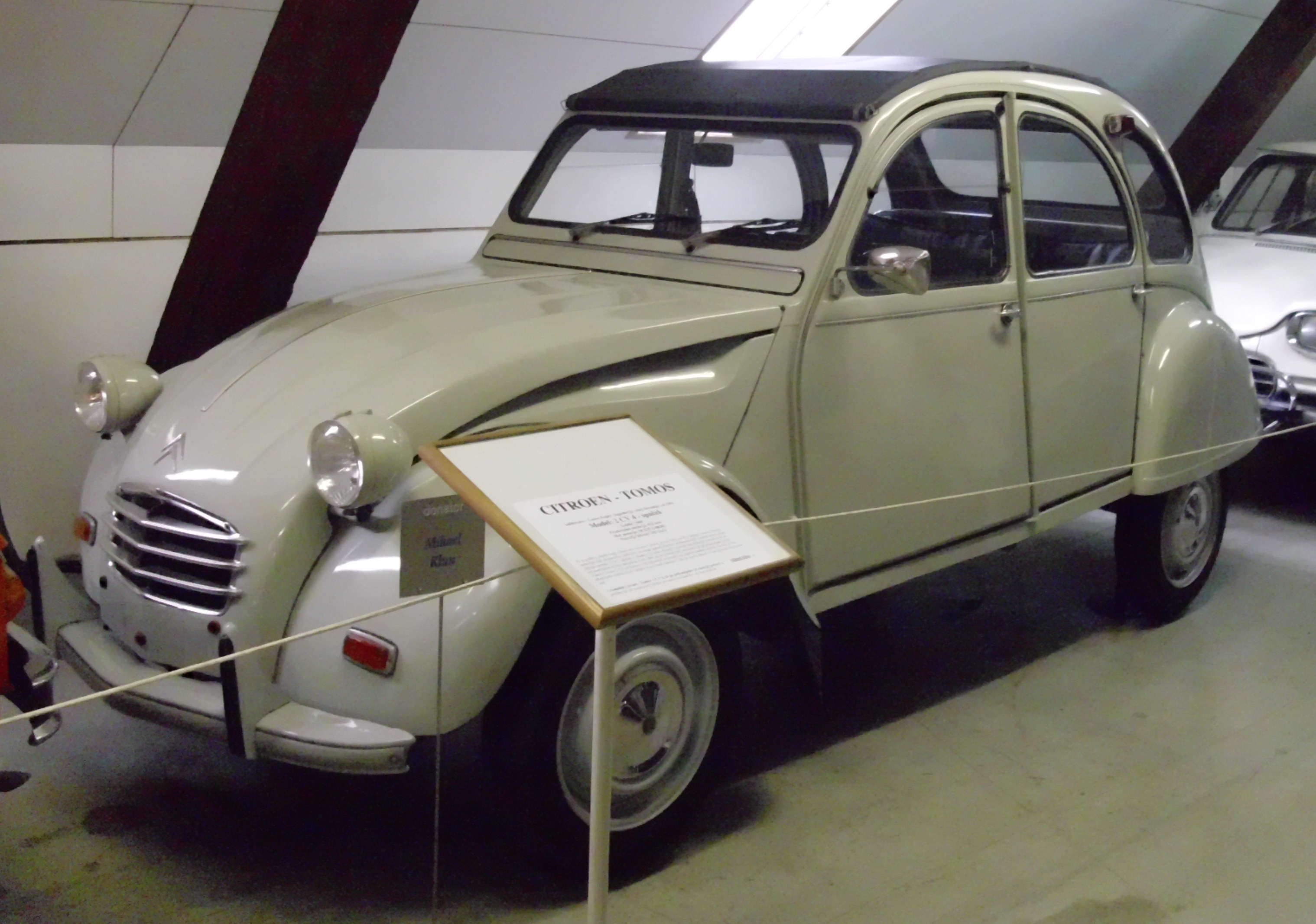
Tomos 2CV

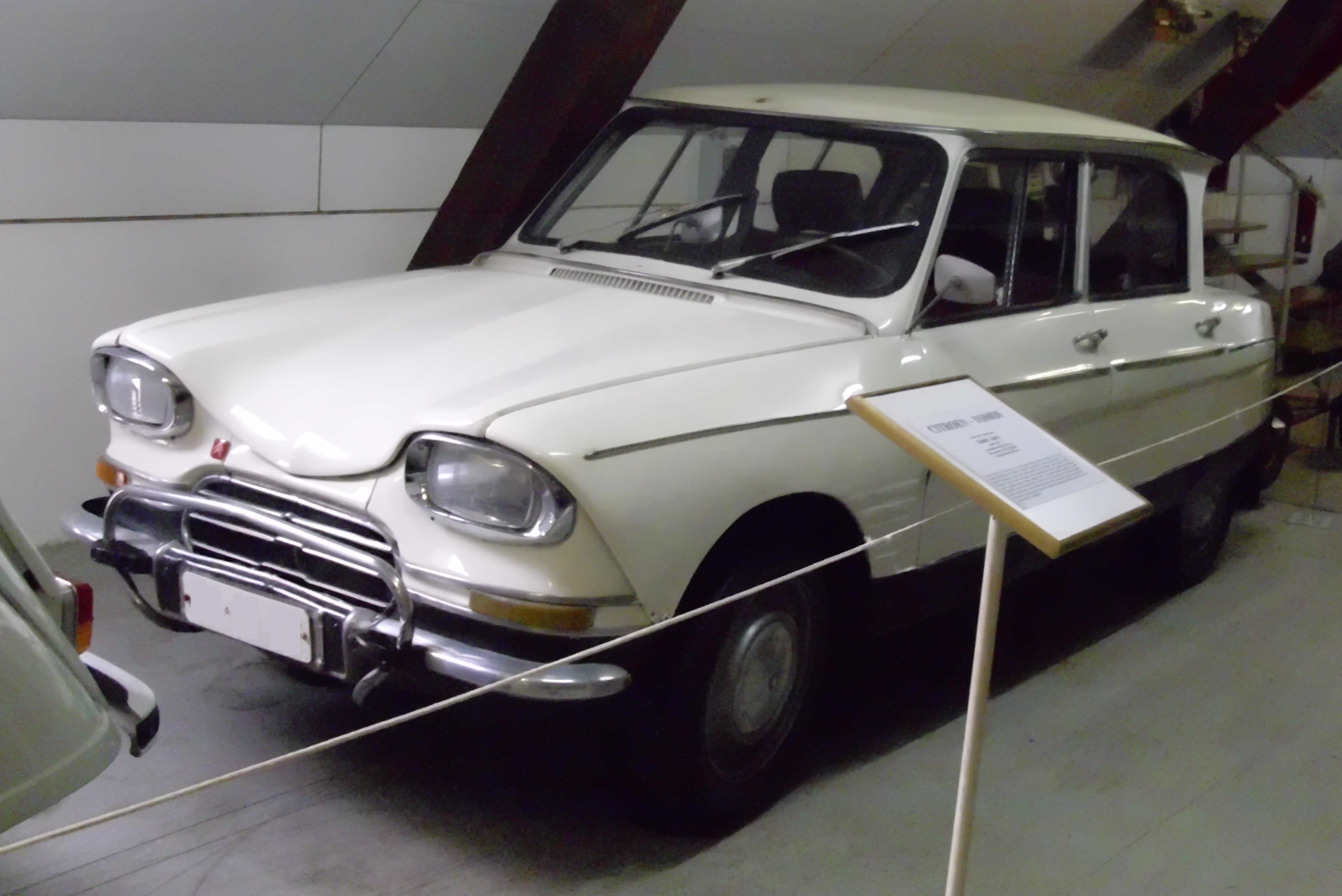
Tomos Ami 6

- Tomos - Citroën 2CV "Spaček"
- Tomos - Citroën Ami 6/8/Super
- Tomos - Citroën DS
- Tomos - Citroën HY
- Tomos - Citroën Diana 6
- Tomos - Citroën GS
- Cimos Citroën GA
- Cimos Citroën AX
- Cimos Citroën BX
- Cimos Citroën CX
- Cimos Citroën Visa
- Cimos Citroën C15
- Cimos Citroën C25
- Cimos Citroën C35
- Tomos - Citroën DAK/Geri

== Outsourcing scare ==
In November 2007, a statement was circulated which was interpreted to imply that Tomos' moped production would cease, as the company was no longer competitive against Chinese and Indian producers. The news caused a stir for several days in the Tomos moped community. However, a problem in translation had caused a misunderstanding, and the company later confirmed it was not ending sales, but instead outsourcing parts of the production.
