= Citroën Acadiane =

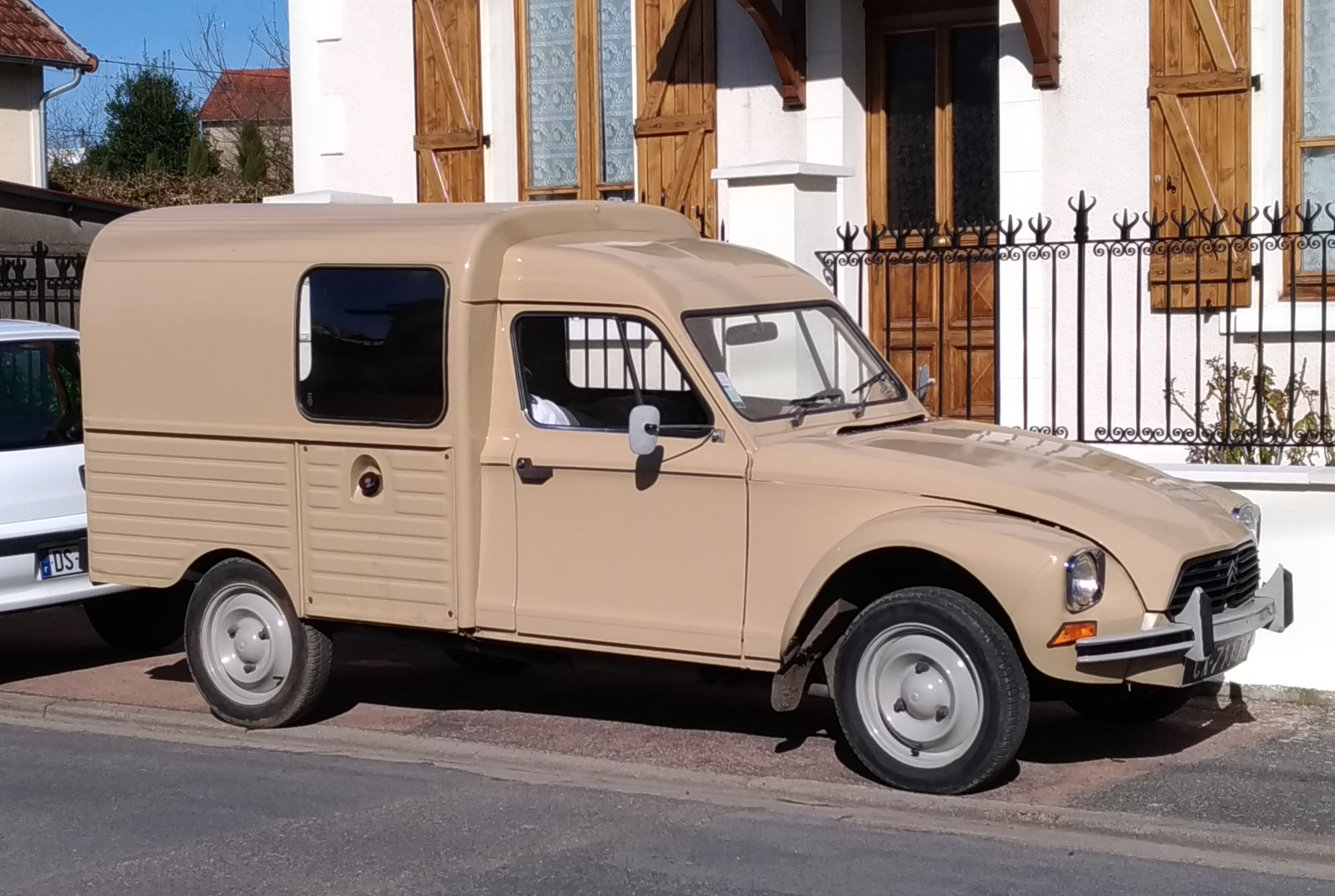

Overview
- Manufacturer: Citroën
- Production: 1977–1987
- Assembly: Spain: Vigo (Vigo Plant); Yugoslavia: Koper, Slovenia (Cimos)

Body and chassis
- Class: Leisure activity vehicle (M)
- Body style: Small van
- Layout: FF layout
- Related: Citroën Dyane

Chronology
- Predecessor: Citroën 2CV Utility
- Successor: Citroën C15

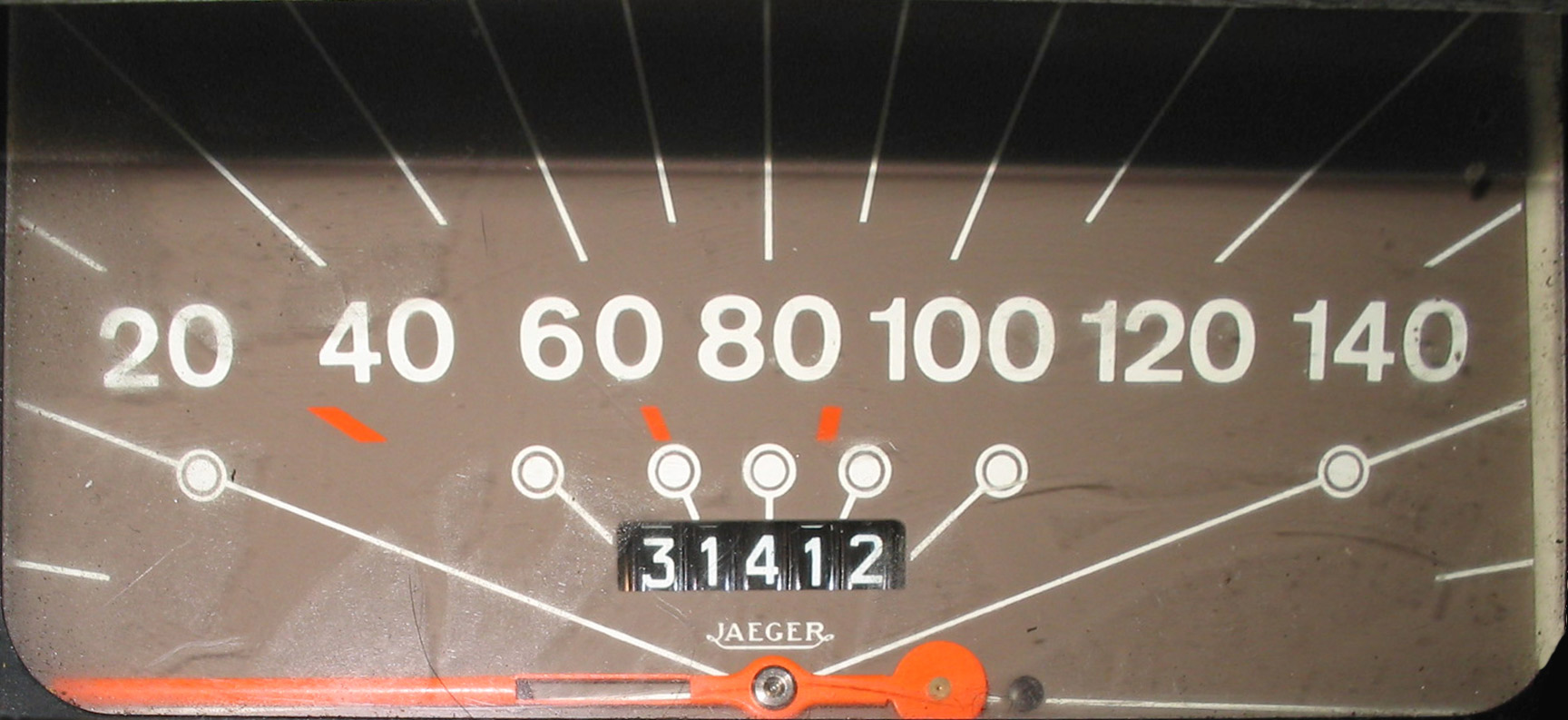
Citroën Acadiane speedometer

The Citroën Acadiane is a small commercial vehicle produced by French company Citroën from 1977 to 1987. It was derived from the Citroën Dyane and available only in left-hand drive. Its production totalled 253,393. The Visa-based C15 van eventually replaced the Acadiane.

== Overview ==
The name "Acadiane" was a pun on AK Dyane "Acadiane" because Citroën had already used the prefix "AK" for its light commercials. There was no connection of the car with the French-speaking Acadiana region of Louisiana or with Acadia, now a region of Canada and the United States.

The Acadiane was available in commercial (two-seater) form or as a "Mixte", with sliding rear windows and a removable rear bench seat. Citroën (in C15 and Berlingo) and many other manufacturers continued with the option of rear seats in a vehicle designed to be commercial. The Mixte version also had a passenger sun visor, missing in the commercial version. In line with many Citroën light commercial vehicles, the roof of the rear bodywork was corrugated to add extra rigidity at little cost. The maximum payload was approximately 500 kg (1,100 lb), although handling was impaired when fully loaded.

The Acadiane differed from the Dyane by offering heavier-duty suspension, a slightly altered chassis, and a rear-brake limiter whose action was dependent on the load. The Acadiane was fitted with wind-down windows in the driver and passenger doors. The Dyane had horizontally-sliding windows.

Top gear in the four-speed box was usually referred to as overdrive. This had been used since the earliest days of the 2CV. Progress could be maintained in top gear, but further acceleration was generally not possible. Third gear was sufficient to reach 80 km/h (50 mph). The Acadiane came from the factory with Michelin 15x135 tires, 10mm wider than those fitted to the 2CV and Dyane cars.

== Production history ==
Model	1977	1978	1979	1980	1981	1982	1983	1984	1985	1986	1987	Total
Acadiane	141	37,787	49,679	45,438	30,881	36,054	20,377	12,756	8,429	7,915	3,936	253,393

== Citroën Geri ==
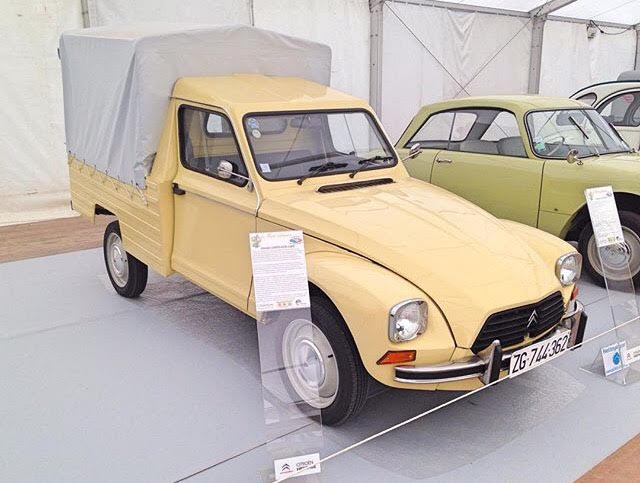
Geri pickup

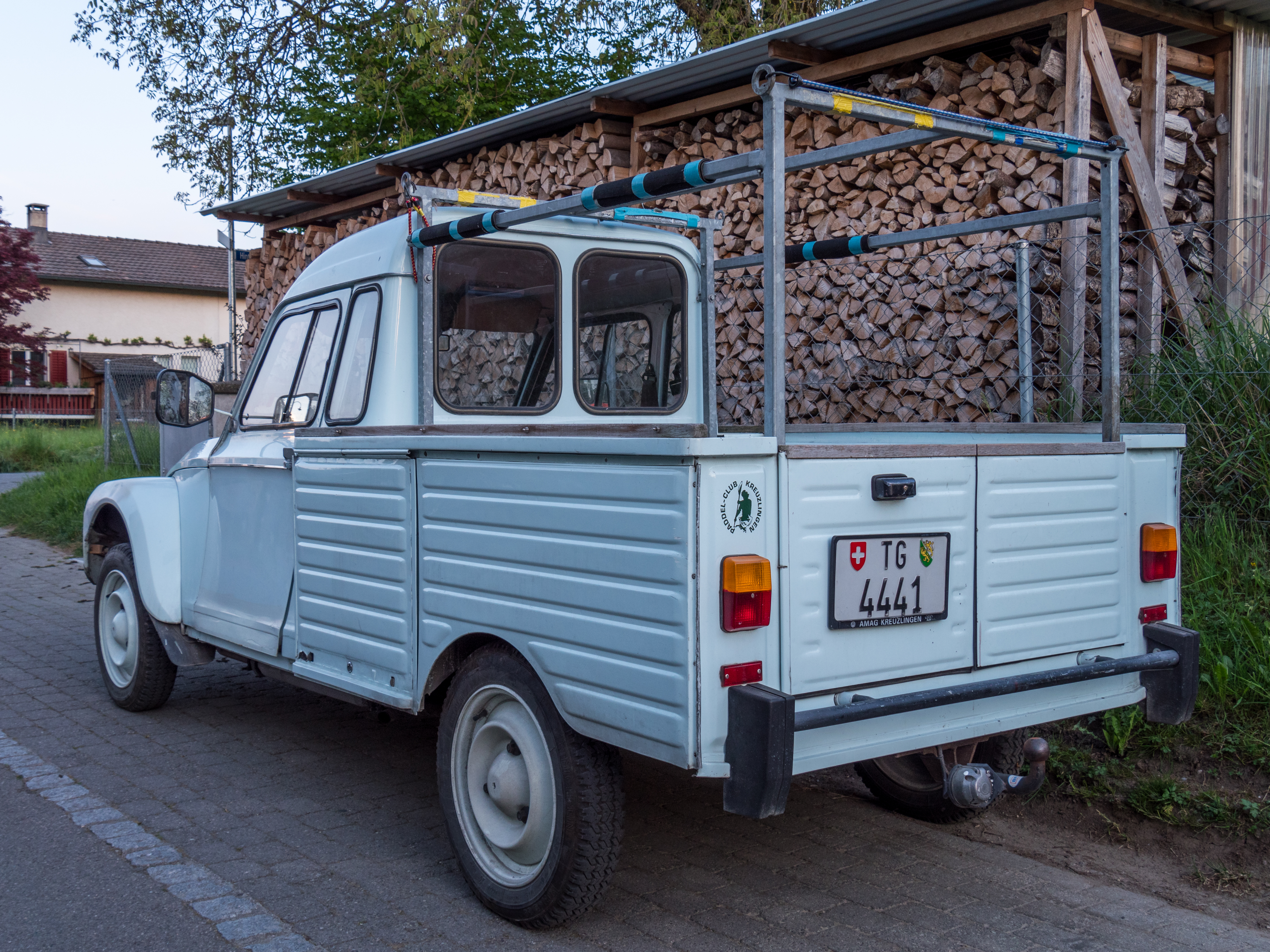
Citroën Acadiane pickup

The Citroën Geri, a pickup variant of the Acadiane, was produced by Cimos in Yugoslavia from 1981 to 1985.
