= Citroën C15 =

Panel van

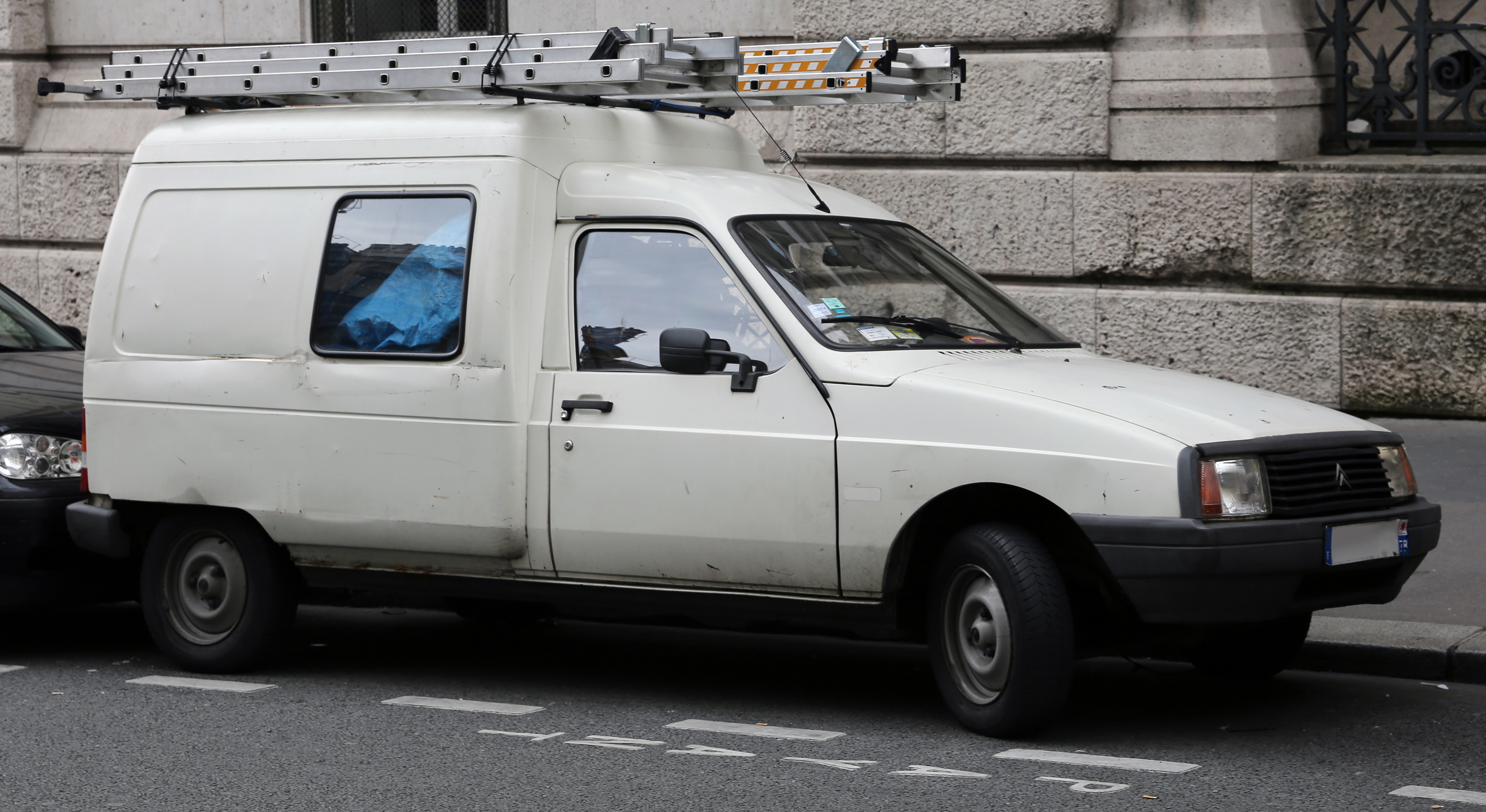
- Pre-facelift C15 (1984–1989)

Overview
- Manufacturer: Citroën
- Production: 1984–2006; 1,181,471 built
- Assembly: Spain: Vigo (Vigo Plant); Portugal: Mangualde (Mangualde Plant); Poland: Nysa (FSO); Morocco: Aïn Sebaâ (Somaca); Taiwan: Taipei (CATC)
- Designer: Jean-Claude Bouvier

Body and chassis
- Class: Leisure activity vehicle (M)
- Body style: Panel van
- Layout: FF layout
- Related: Citroën Visa; Peugeot 104; Talbot Samba; Citroën LNA

Chronology
- Predecessor: Citroën Acadiane
- Successor: Citroën Berlingo

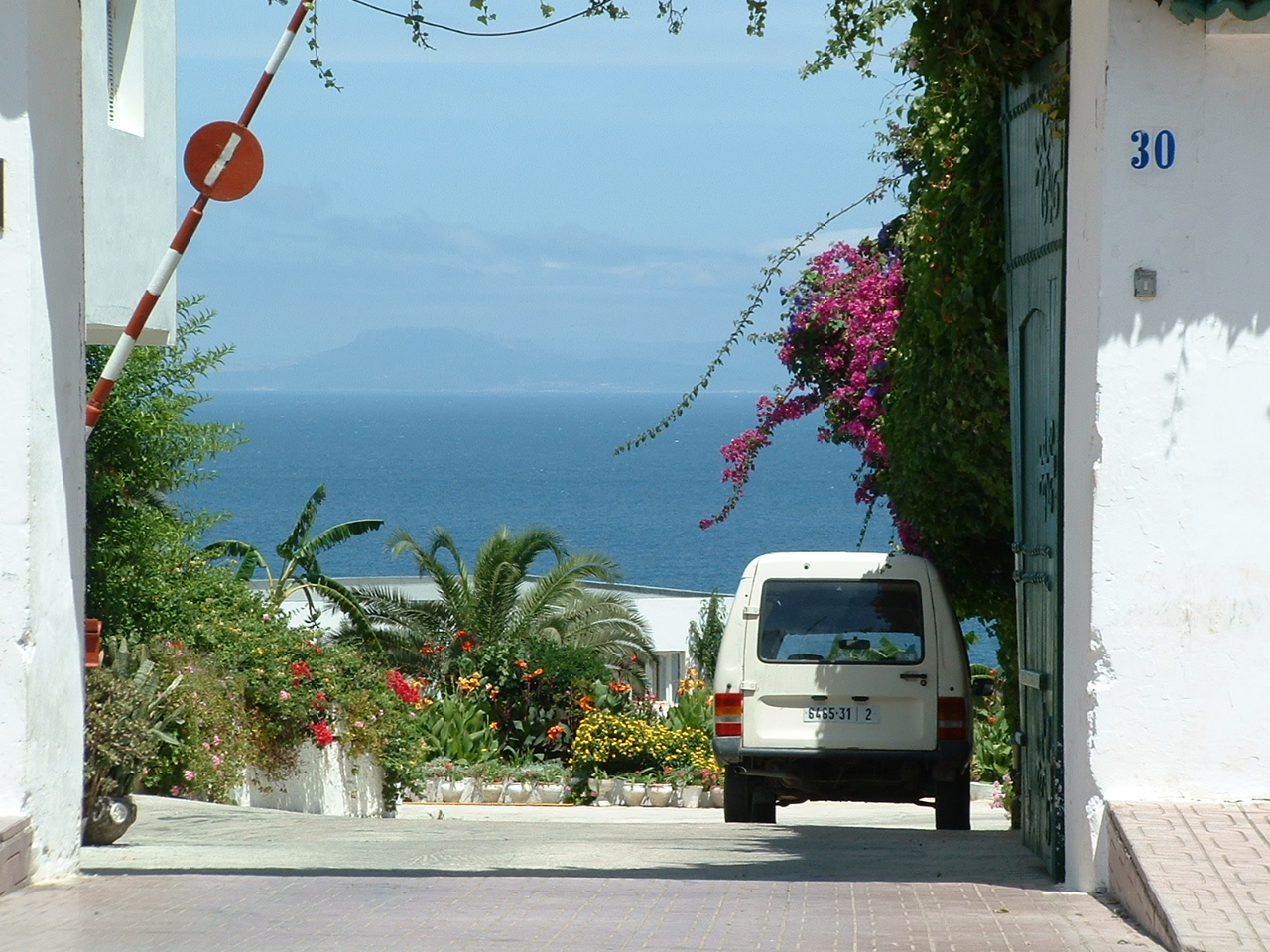
Citroën C15D Rear, early single door

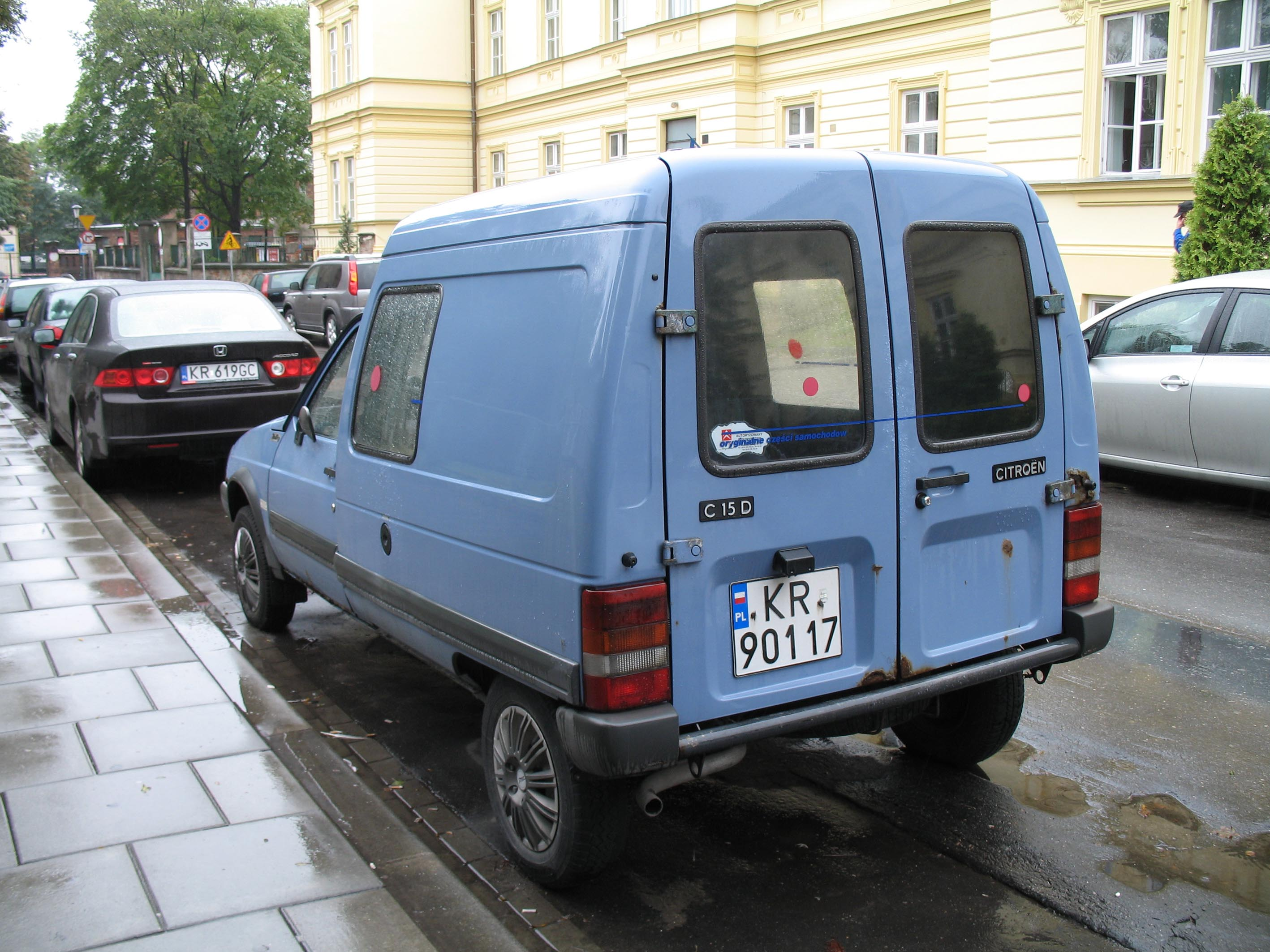
Citroën C15D Rear, later twin doors

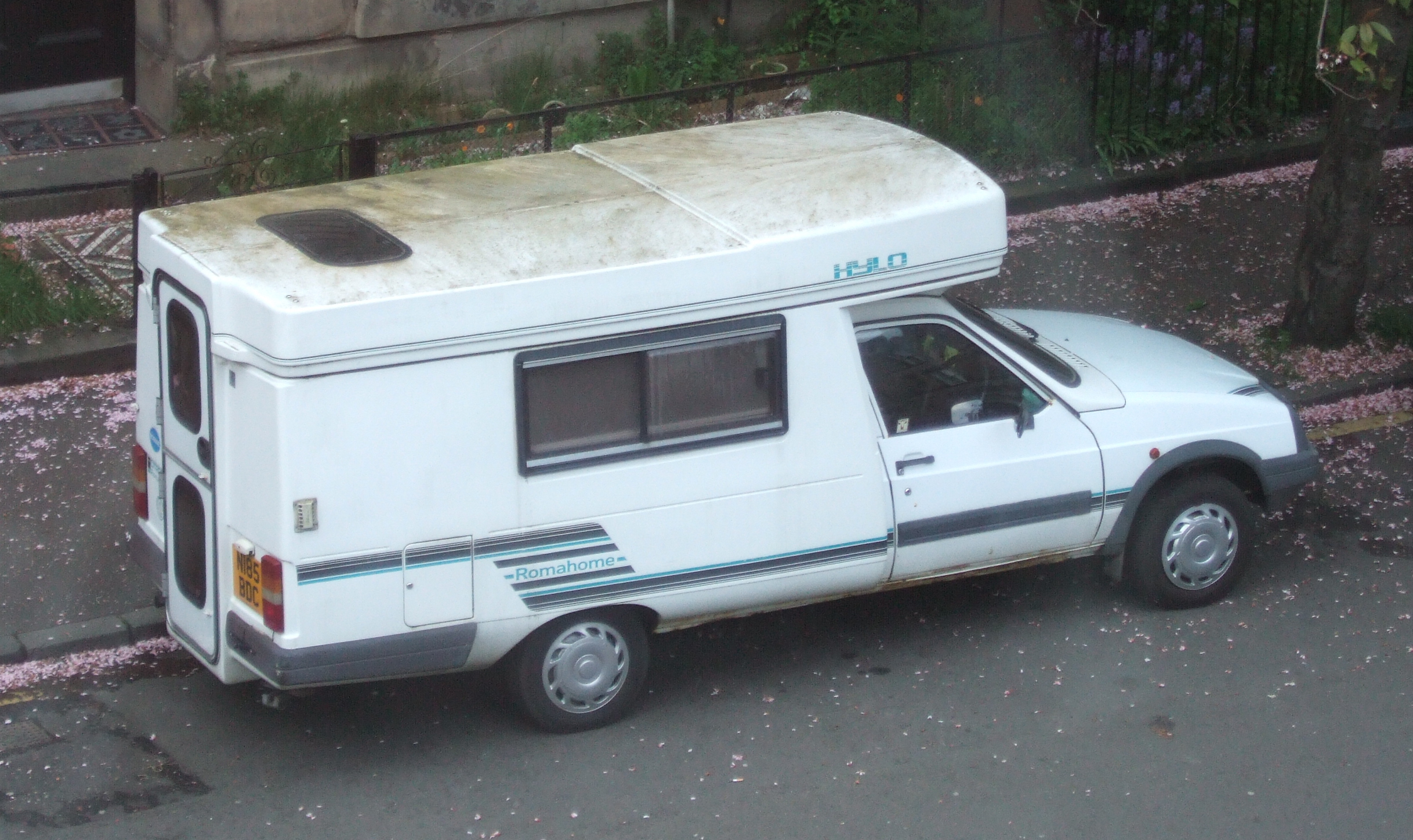
Romahome conversion

The Citroën C15 is a panel van produced by the French manufacturer Citroën from late 1984 until 2006. It was the successor to the Citroën Acadiane, which had replaced the Citroën 2CV vans that pioneered the box van format from the 1950s to the 1970s, although the Acadiane continued in production alongside the C15 initially. The name refers to the car's 1,500 kg (3,310 lb) French gross vehicle weight rating and indicates its position beneath the C25 and C35 in Citroën's commercial vehicle range at the time.

== Design ==
The C15 was based on the Citroën Visa (discontinued 1988), and mainly used a 1769 cc XUD or 1868 cc (DW8 on late models), naturally aspirated (non turbo) diesel engine. Until the early 1990s, it was also available with a petrol PSA TU engine. At the time of introduction, the engines were the 60 PS (44 kW) XUD (C15D) or the 47 PS (35 kW) 1124 cc petrol TU1 (C15E). The diesel engines also powered vehicles several classes larger. Both Bosch and Lucas/CAV/Roto diesel injection systems were used. The TU petrol-engined versions were sold until the beginning of the 1990s. The engines and drivetrains were taken from the Citroën Visa lineup.

While the car was mostly the same as a regular Citroën Visa ahead of the B-pillar, the cargo area was unique. The C15 had a lengthened wheelbase, and a sturdier rear axle shared with the Peugeot 305 Break and Citroën BX since it had to carry heavier loads than the Visa. The very curved sides of the windscreen, enabled the use of a very large single wiper on the long narrow windscreen, without it catching the windscreen seal. The shape of the bumper and plastic trim on the front of the van, like those of the Visa car, were designed to aerodynamically reduce the deposition of dirt on the headlights, and to reduce the risk of stone chips to the headlights, bonnet and windscreen.

The heating and ventilation system, (even though it used only a water control valve for temperature control and not air mixing), could provide cold air from fascia side vents, to the face while warming the car. The central directable fascia vents could be pointed directly at the windscreen in front of the driver, to blow hot air to keep it clear in extreme misting conditions. There was also an additional mid-level vent. The C15 also had height adjustable halogen headlights, and multi speed/intermittent front wipers, which was better than most commercial vehicles of the time.

As well as standard van configuration, the vehicle later became available with rear side windows and a rear seat, (a layout which had been pioneered in the 2CV), which can be seen as a forerunner to today's compact utility vehicles such as the Ford Transit Connect, Opel/Vauxhall Combo, Peugeot Partner/Citroën Berlingo and Renault Kangoo. The C15 was also available without the rear bodywork, as a chassis only model. This encouraged various conversions such as the campervan called the RomaHome built by British company Island Plastics. This small camper was suitable for two people. Rare pickup truck versions were also made.

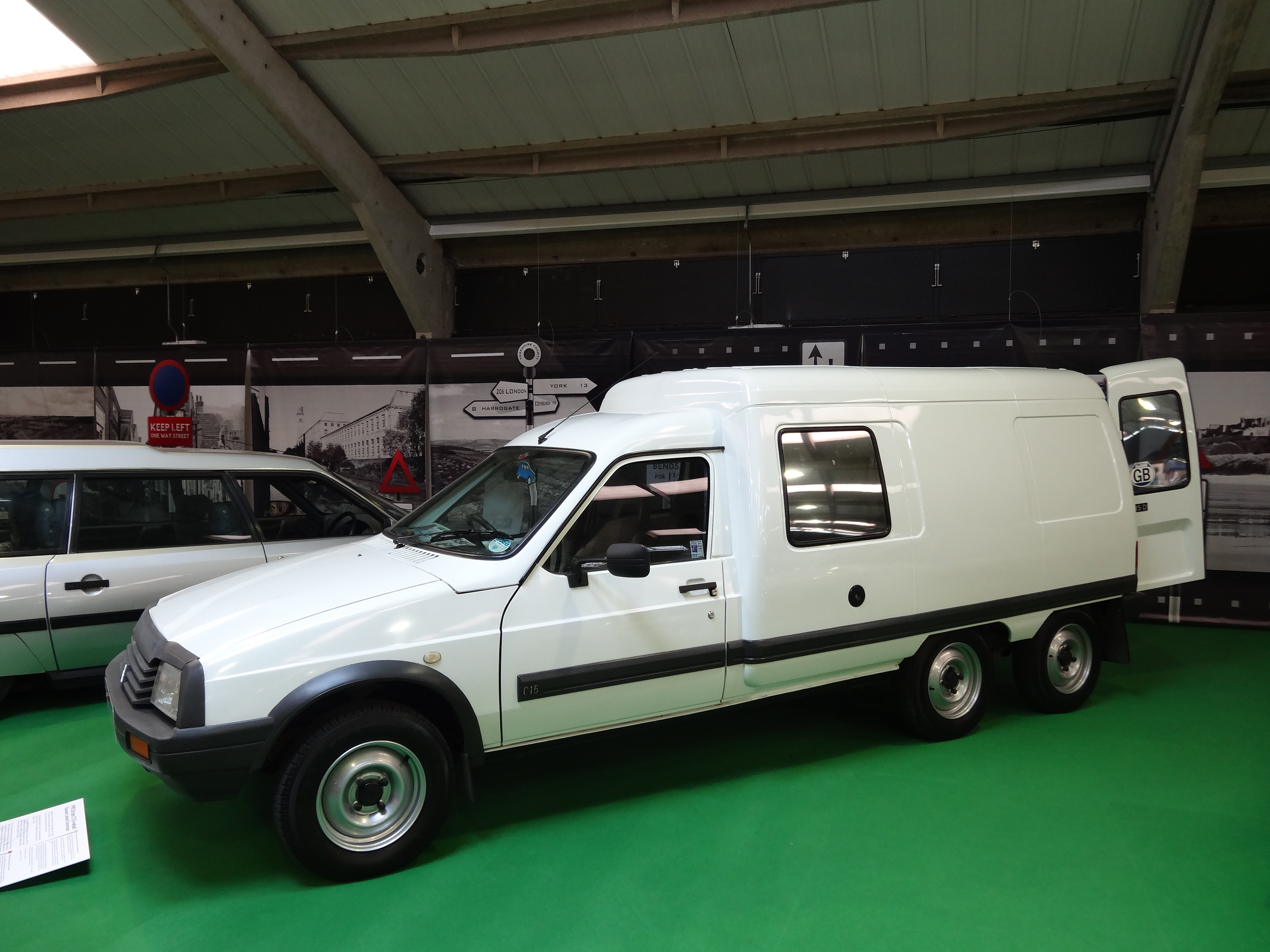
Six-wheeled 1995 Citroën C15.6 built by Chausson

By December 2005, when it was discontinued in most countries, production had reached 1,181,471. The last three built were given to:

- The government of Vigo city in Spain, where the production of this car was held for last few years
- Museum of Citroën cars in Aulnay
- One for the Vigo car factory, where it was built

The original Visa was built for about ten years, but the C15 had a twenty-one-year production run. During that time there were various minor changes and upgrades made. Models with 600 kg and 800 kg load capacities were introduced (the original was 500 kg). Trim details were changed to give it a facelift in September 1989, when a lower grille with three cross bars was introduced, with the turn signals now mounted in the bumper and with an offset Citroën logo. In 1992, side plastic trims were added, and the bonnet trim again changed somewhat.

== Variants and history ==
The C15 was introduced in the United Kingdom in 1985, initially badged with the pun 'van blanc' or 'van rouge' according to body colour. Models for the United Kingdom were always shipped without rear side windows, as is usual for vans in Britain, due to tax regulations. European models had side windows, and a combi version called Weekend, with an easily removed rear bench seat. There was also, in France at least, a rather rare stretched version, which was about 0.5 meters longer than a normal C15.

Early models had a single wide rear door, but this was awkward for loading in a tight space and prone to sagging or to snapping off in a high wind, so, after a year or two, only conventional two door versions were sold with fold back hinges.

Numerous changes were made to the engine ancillaries over the years. Early diesel-engined models had an inline electrical fuel heater, which invariably stopped working after a couple of years. Later models instead had the fuel pass over the thermostat housing to warm it up instead.

The fuel filter moved from the wing to the top of the thermostat housing. The oil filler moved from the crankcase cover to the dipstick housing. The front indicators were originally combined with the headlights, but later replaced by side lights (moved from the headlight reflector) and separate indicators were fitted in the bumper.

Dangel made a 4-wheel drive version in 1992.

In February 1997, the catalyzed diesel C15 was commercialized.

The C15 was officially replaced by the Citroën Nemo during 2007.

=== Citroën C15 Electrique ===
In 1987, a prototype electric version of the C15 was made and road tested for 2 years in La Rochelle and Brussels to validate the concept. Modifications were made overtime to the vehicle, like moving the batteries from inside the engine compartment to behind the front seats to provide room for a 5 speed manual gearbox that proved to be more reliable to handle the motor's power and rpm requirements.

Once the tests proved the van worked, the vehicle was sold to the public, mainly to fleets, from 1990 to 1994. 402 units were sold, mainly to countries like Austria, and helped Citroën study how to make an EV for the future, and the C15 Electrique was succeeded by the Citroën Berlingo Electrique in 1998. A larger Citroën C25 was also produced.

The van had a separately excited brushed DC electric motor made by Leroy Somer, which makes a nominal power of 10 kW (13 hp), and a maximum power of 18 kW (24 hp). Maximum torque is 140 N⋅m (100 ft⋅lb) at 1.400 revolutions. 16 6V VRLA lead acid batteries power the van with a diesel tank for powering a heater.

Powertrain specs:

- Electric motor: Brushed DC, separately excited (Leroy Somer TFK 132-150)
- Power: nominal 10kW, maximum power 18 kW
- Maximum torque: 140Nm at 1.400 revolutions
- Cooling: Air cooled
- Transmission: five-speed manual and reverse gear with dry single-disc clutch
- Top speed: 90 km/h
- Range: 70-100km
- Acceleration 0-50km/h: 12 seconds
- Batteries: 16 Dry Fit 6V 160 Ah Sonnenschein VRLA lead-acid batteries (total weight: 504 kilos)
- Normal charge: through a 220V and 16A domestic outlet
- Fast charging: through a specific 40A socket
- Weight: 1.400 kilos (conventional C15 805 kilos)

== See also ==
- SEAT Terra
- Renault Express
