= Dangel =

Automobile company

Automobiles Dangel
- Industry: Automobile conversion
- Headquarters: Sentheim, Alsace, France

Automobiles Dangel is a French specialist automobile company based in Sentheim, Alsace. It has produced 4x4 versions of Citroën and Peugeot vehicles since 1980. Its first conversion was the Peugeot 504 and since then Dangel has converted over 22,000 vehicles. Originally a producer of competition cars, beginning in the late sixties, their first four-wheel drive conversions were developed with the direct assistance of Peugeot's own engineers.

== Former models ==
Dangel also produced modified versions of the following vehicles:

- Peugeot 504 pick-up and station wagon
- Peugeot 505 station wagon
- Citroën C15
- Citroën C25
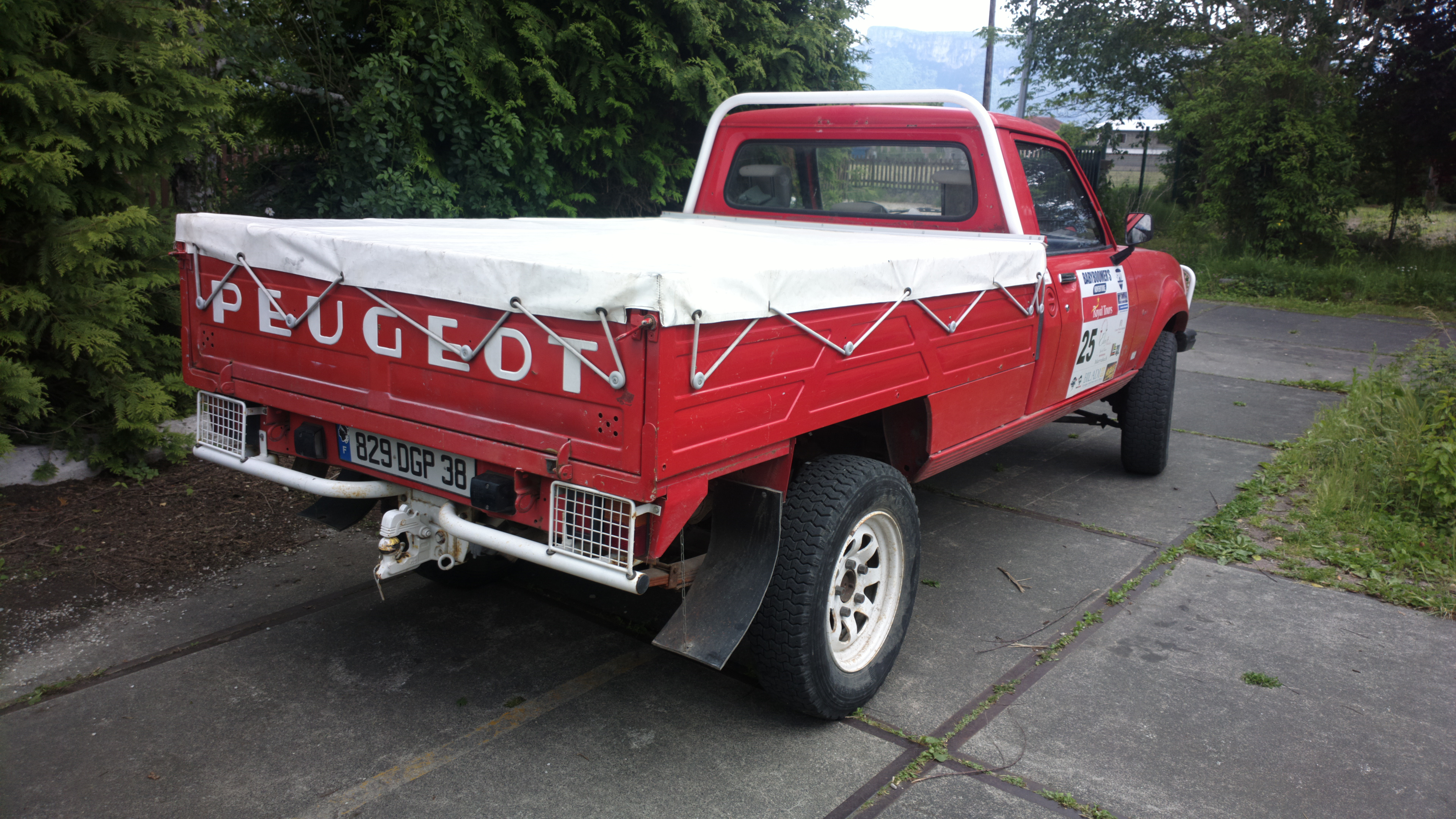
1984 Peugeot 504 4x4 Dangel

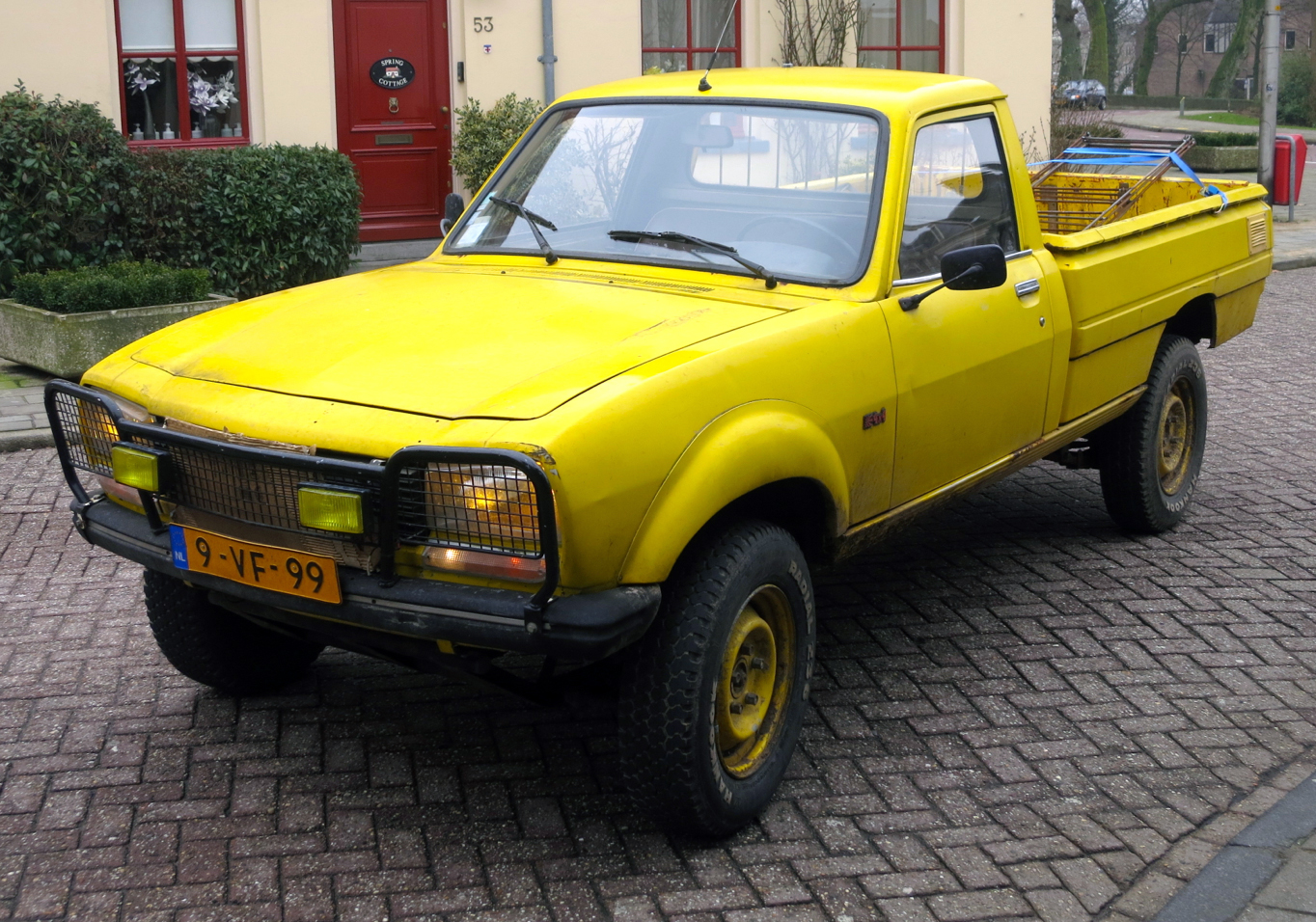
1986 Peugeot 504 Pick-up Dangel 4x4

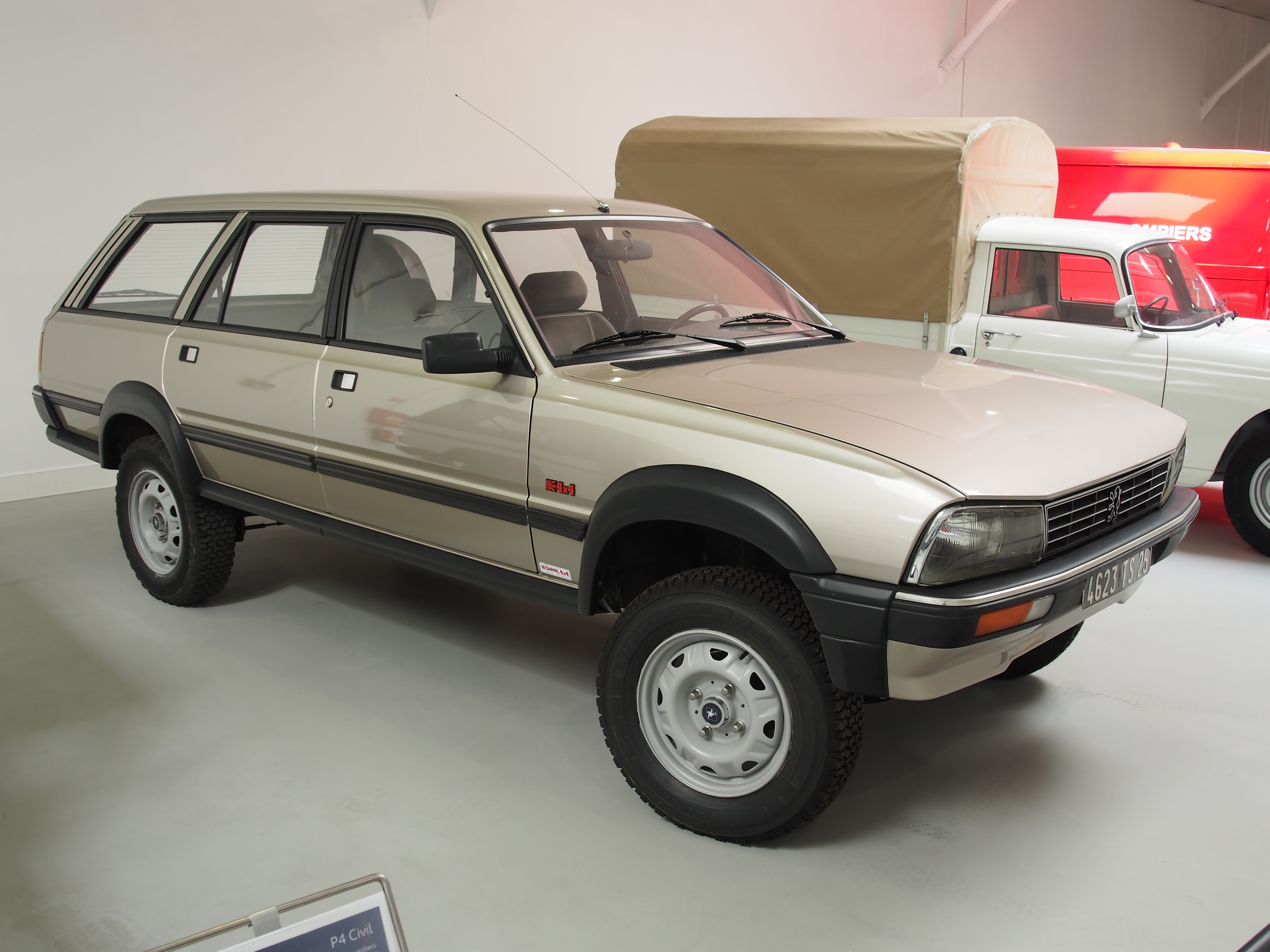
Peugeot 505 Break Dangel 4x4

== Current models ==
Dangel currently modifies the following vehicles:

4x2

Both the Peugeot Bipper and Citroën Nemo 1.3 HDi 75 hp are available with Dangel's Trek 2WD version which has a 200mm chassis lift, engine skidplate and a limited-slip differential.

4x4

- Citroën - Berlingo, Jumpy, and Jumper
- Fiat - Ducato and Scudo
- Peugeot - Peugeot Boxer, Expert, and Partner
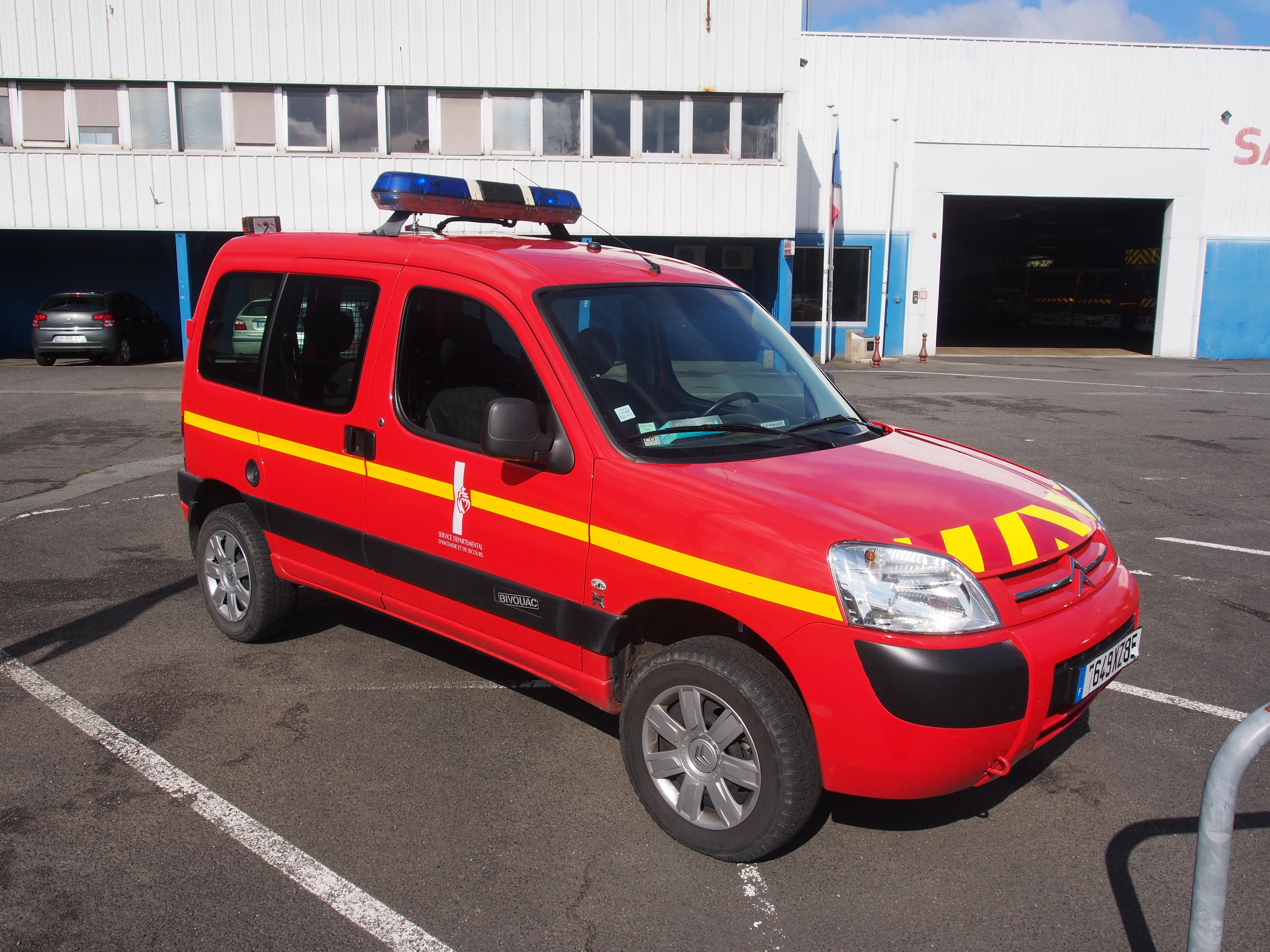
French Fire brigade Citroën Berlingo in Les Sables-d'Olonne

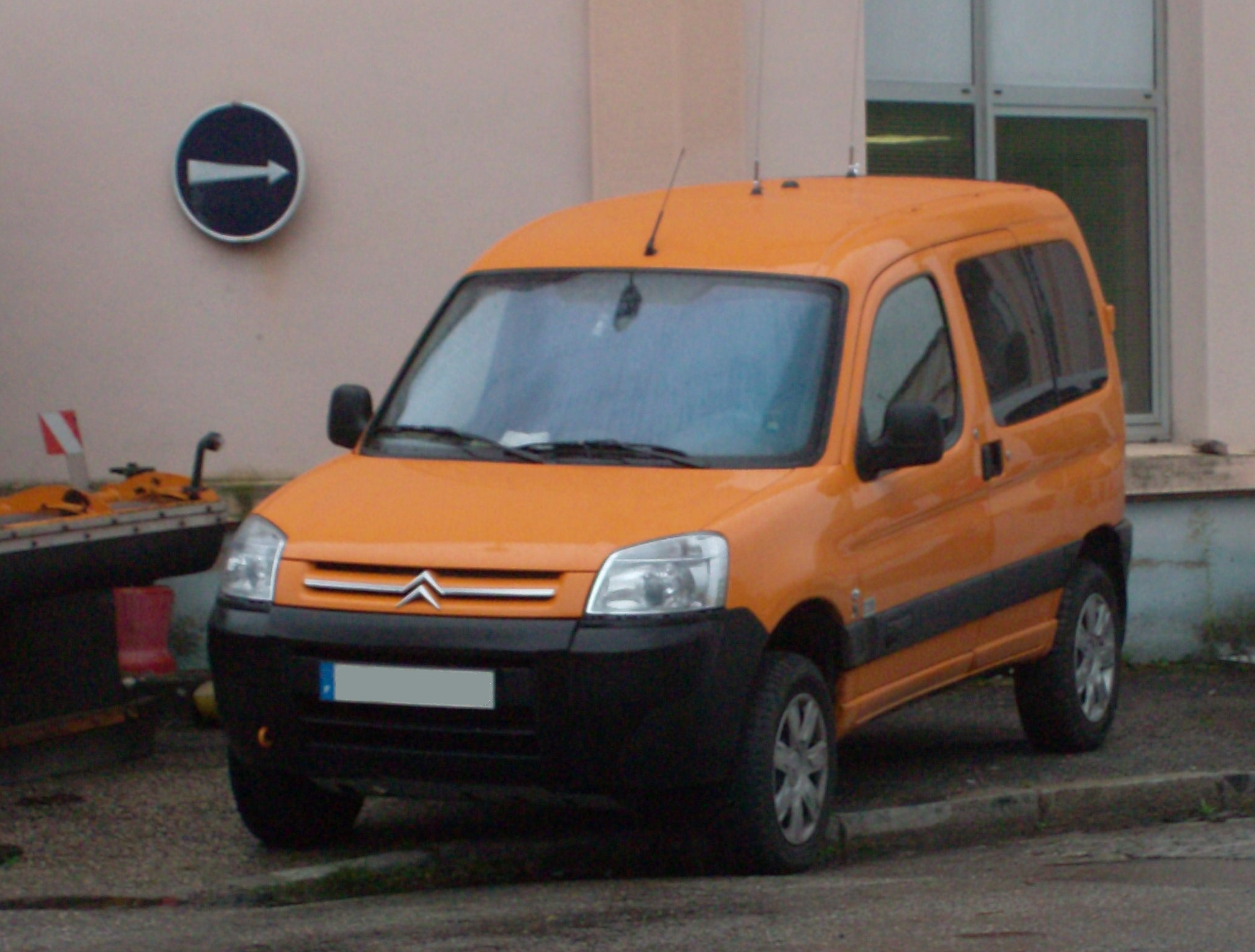
Citroën Berlingo with Dangel system

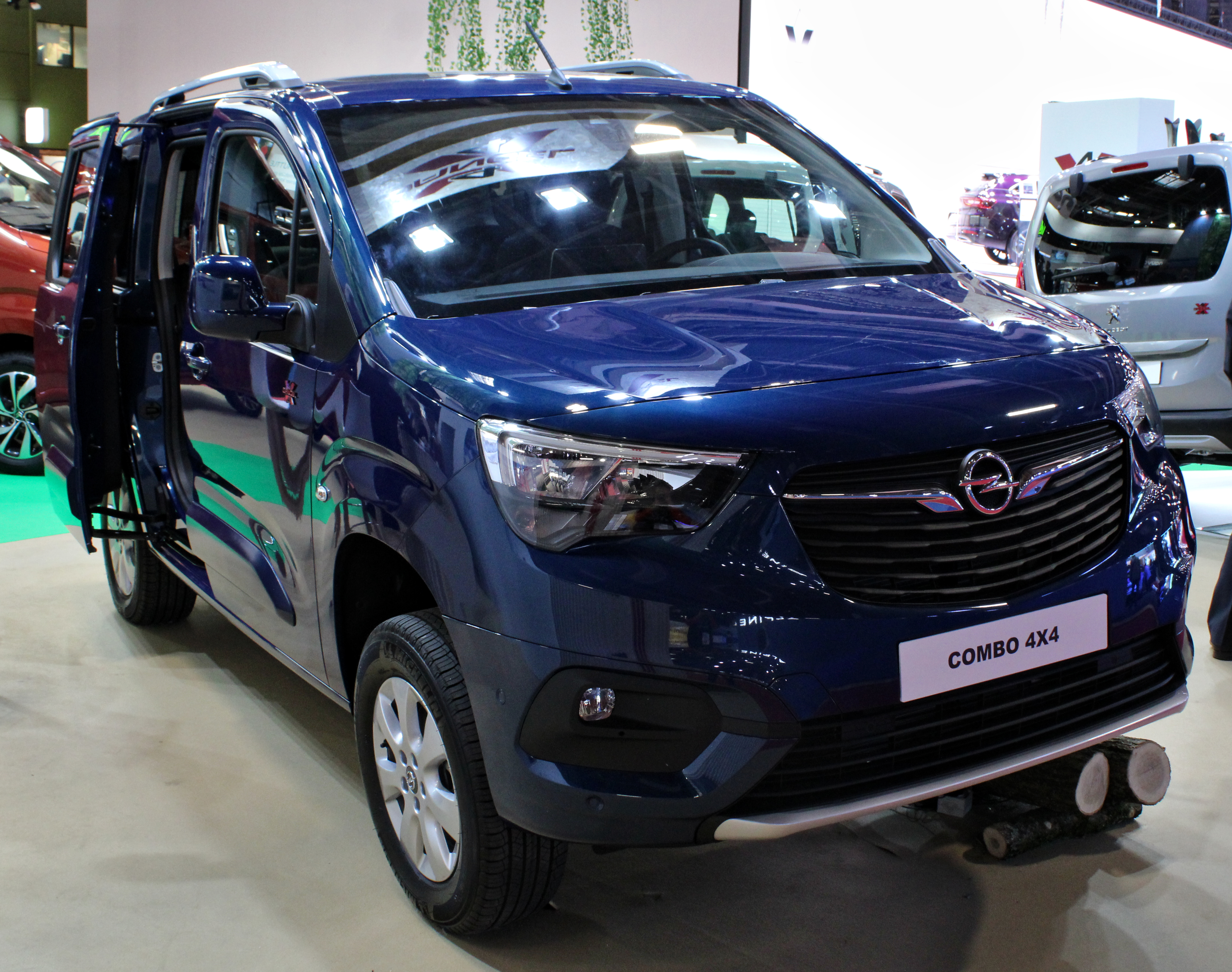
Opel Combo with Dangel system

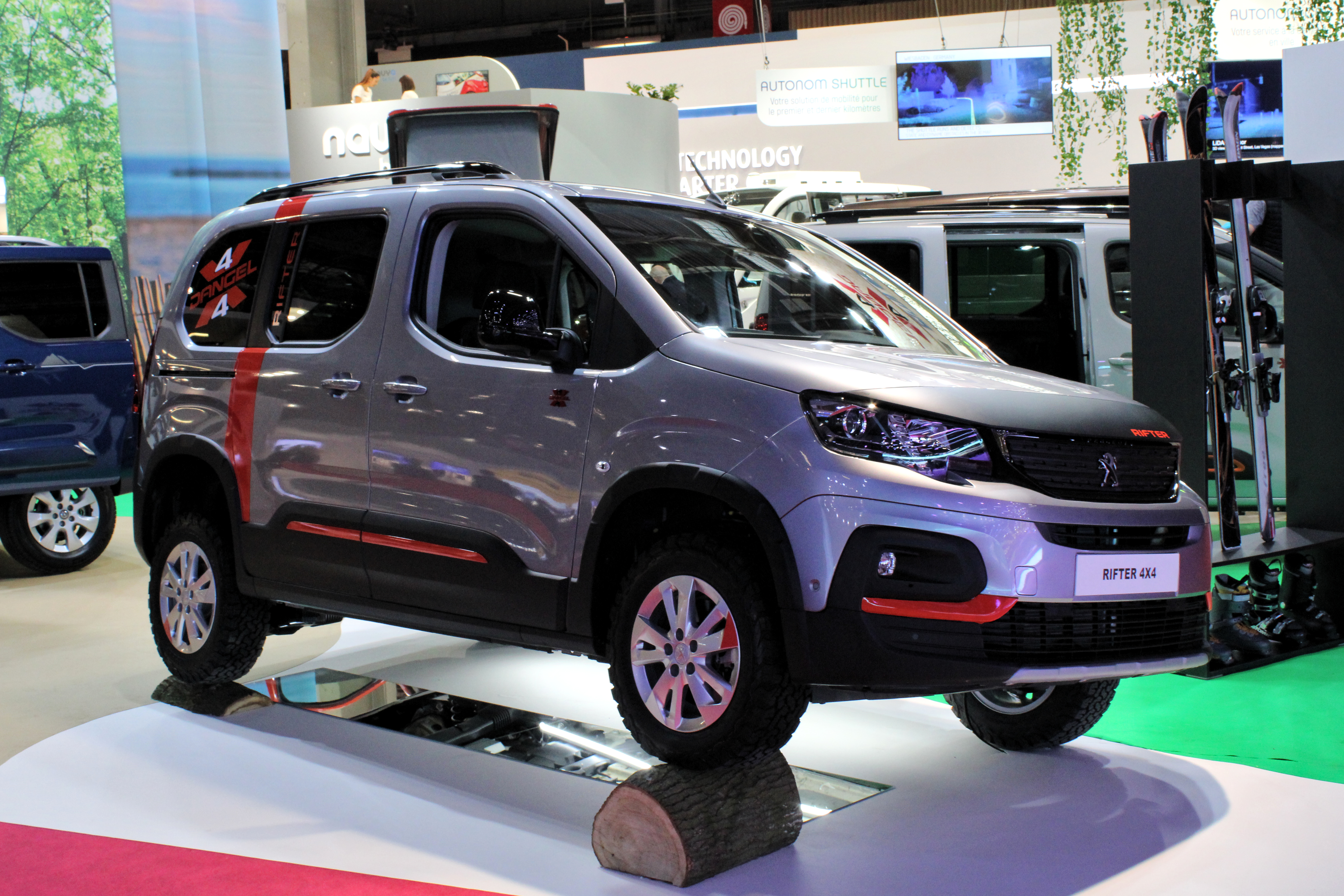
Peugeot Rifter with Dangel system
