= Fiat 238 =

Fiat 238 E
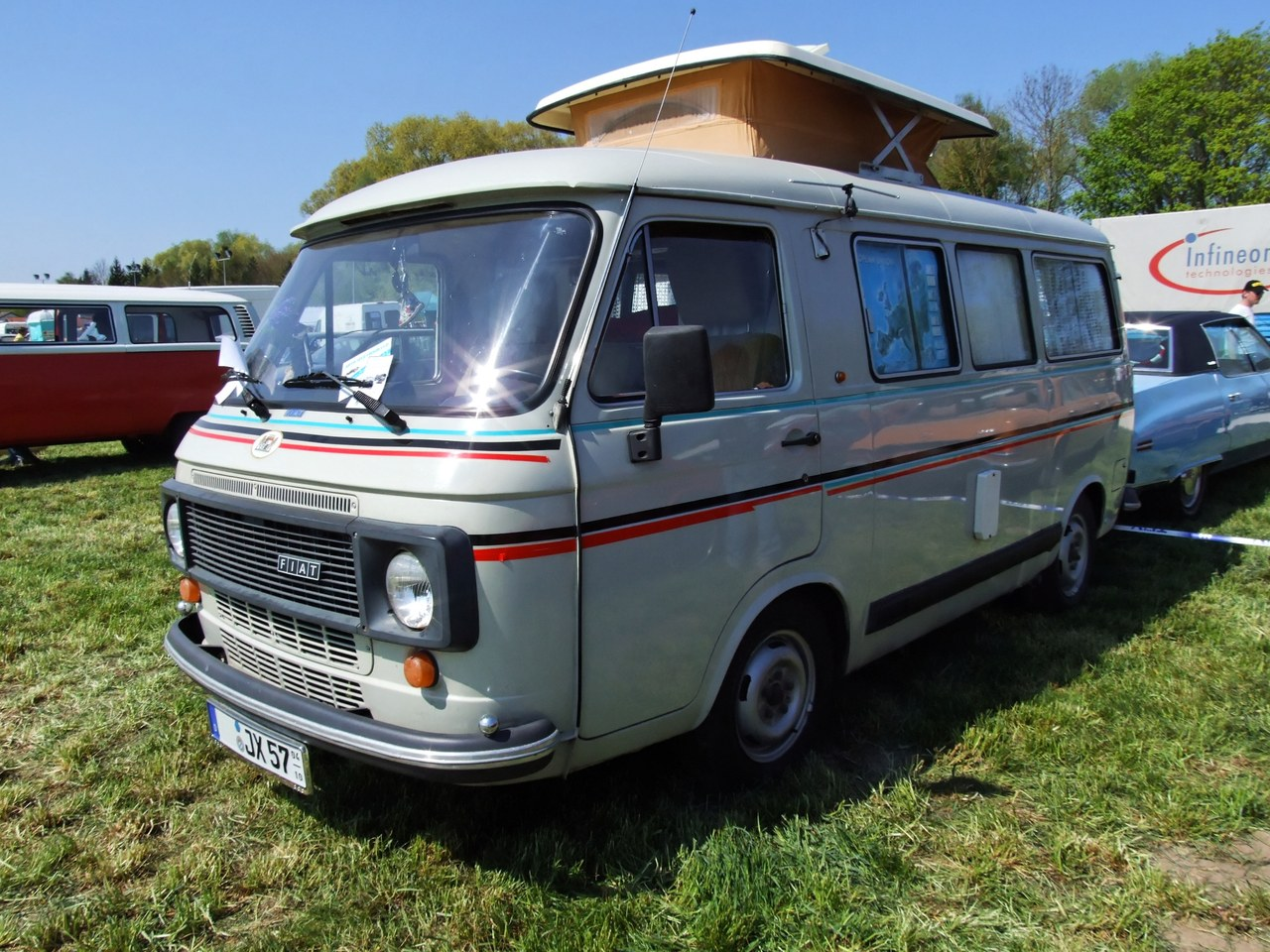

Overview
- Manufacturer: Fiat
- Also called: Fiat 238 Mira
- Production: 1965-1983

Body and chassis
- Class: Van (M)
- Layout: FF layout
- Related: Autobianchi Primula

Dimensions
- Wheelbase: 2,400 mm (94.5 in)
- Length: 4,600 mm (181.1 in)
- Width: 1,835 mm (72.2 in)
- Height: 1,980 mm (78.0 in)
- Curb weight: 975 kg (2,150 lb)

Chronology
- Predecessor: Fiat 1100T
- Successor: Fiat 242; Fiat Ducato

The Fiat 238 was a van produced by the Italian automotive production firm Fiat from 1967 through 1983. The 238 was introduced in 1967 as the logical successor for the Fiat 1100T and had an under-seat transverse engine because the model was a front-wheel drive. The van was based on the chassis of the Autobianchi Primula and had a downtuned version of its 1,221 cc petrol engine, producing 43 cv. A year later this engine would be replaced by the 1,197 cc engine of the Fiat 124, with the option of the 1,438 cc engine of the Fiat 124 Special, but then with 46 cv, as also used in the Fiat 241 pickup with rear-wheel drive. The 238 was produced in many different body styles for utility and personnel transport. In 1974 Fiat introduced a new van, the 242 with a larger petrol engine and also a diesel engine variant. Despite that, the sales of Fiat 238 did not weaken and Fiat decided to keep it in its lineup, and made the new bigger 1.4-liter engine also available to the 238 model. The 238 was produced until 1983 and was replaced with the Ducato, when a total of 299,500 had been made.

== Engines ==
The 238 was also briefly built by Germany's Neckar-Fiat. It was also popular for mobile home conversions since the front-wheel-drive packaging allowed for a low, flat floor, enabling a very spacious living area for such a compact and light vehicle. Ruggeri, Weinsberg, Westfalia, and many others provided conversions.

== Engines ==
- 1967–1968: 1221 cc petrol 43 PS (32 kW; 42 hp)
- 1968–1983: 1197 cc petrol 44 PS (32 kW; 43 hp)
- 1968–1975: 1438 cc petrol 46 PS (34 kW; 45 hp)
- 1975–1983: 1438 cc petrol 52 PS (38 kW; 51 hp)
