= Fiat 241 =

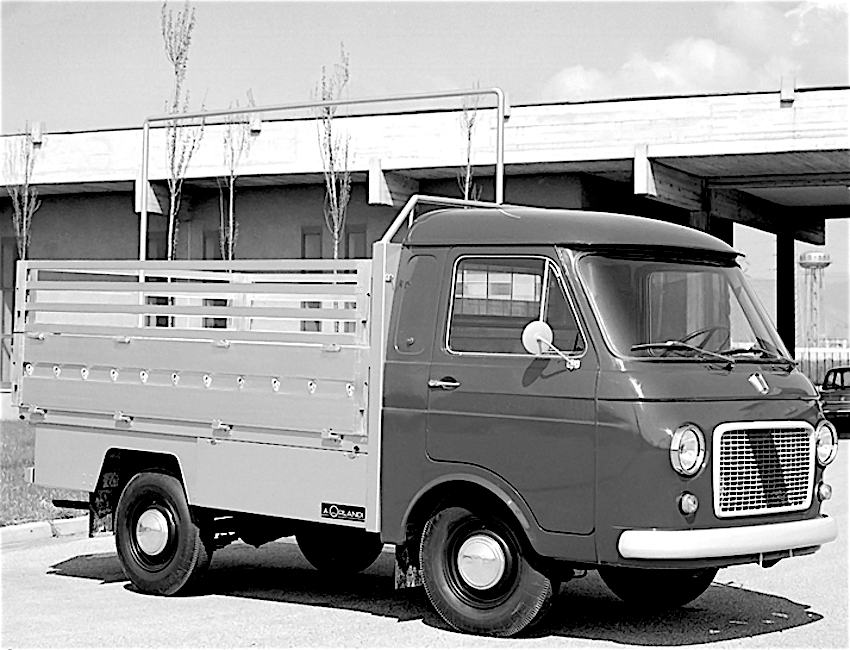

Overview
- Manufacturer: Fiat
- Production: 1965-1974

Body and chassis
- Class: Van
- Body style: pickup, box van
- Layout: FR layout
- Doors: 2
- Related: Fiat 238

Powertrain
- Engine: 1,438cc, 1,895cc
- Power output: 51bhp, 47bhp
- Transmission: 4 speed synchromesh
- Hybrid drivetrain: 4x2

Dimensions
- Length: 4,627 mm (15.2 ft)

Chronology
- Predecessor: Fiat 1100T
- Successor: Fiat 242

The Fiat 241 is a van produced by Fiat between 1965 and 1974. It has a payload of 1,400 kg (3,100 lb) and was available in truck, van and bare chassis variants. The model was a replacement for the 1100T pickup which had ceased production in 1964.

The Fiat 241 was offered in parallel to the Fiat 238, with which it shares the cabin design. The 241 has rear-wheel drive, as opposed to the 238 which has front-wheel drive. The engine in the 241 was centrally located in the cab, unlike the 238 whose engine is housed under the passenger bench, thus, the 241 has only two seats. It had two engine options: a 1438 cc OHV petrol engine, derived from that of the passenger car Fiat 124 Special, producing 51 PS (38 kW; 50 bhp) with a 4-speed gearbox, and a 1895 cc diesel, the same as in the Campagnola, producing 47 PS (35 kW; 46 bhp).

Front suspension is independent with coil springs, with semi-elliptic springs at the rear, supported by telescopic dampers and anti-roll bars on both axles. The total length of the vehicle was 4,627 mm (15.2 ft), with a wheelbase of 2,303 mm (7.6 ft) and loading area of 2,860 mm (9.4 ft) by 1,680 mm (5.5 ft). Available in drop-side, platform and pickup versions. It was later replaced by the Fiat 242. A total of 79,000 were produced.

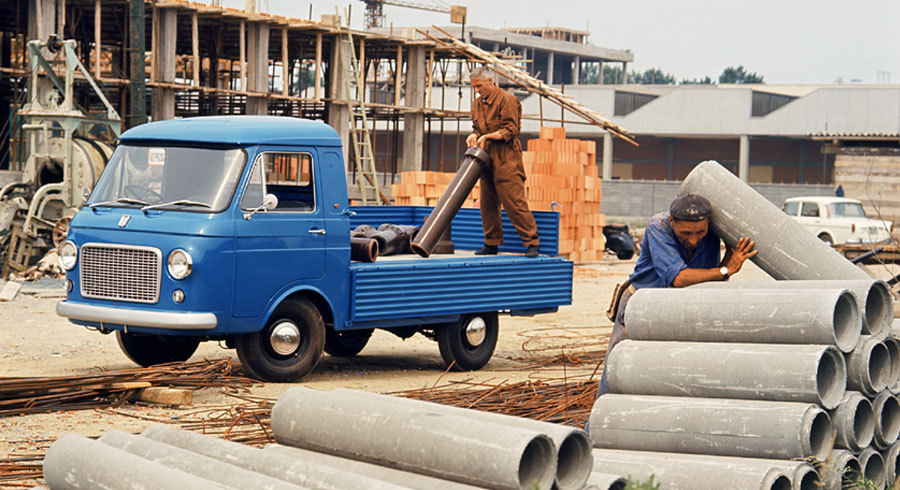
Fiat 241 Pick-up van drop-side version in 1967
