= Stellantis Vigo Plant =

Spanish car manufacturing and assembly plant

Coordinates: 42°12′21″N 8°44′37″W

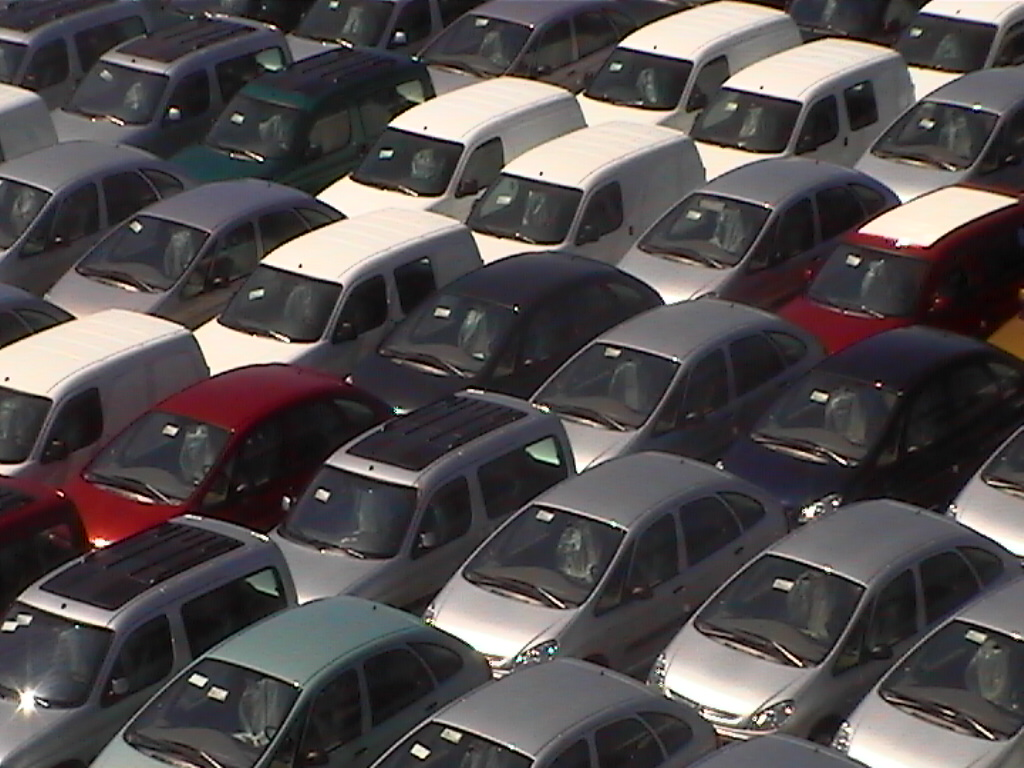
PSA Vigo Plant

The Stellantis Vigo plant (Centro de Vigo de Stellantis) is a Spanish car manufacturing and assembly plant in Vigo, Galicia, Spain, owned by Stellantis (formerly Groupe PSA).

The plant was established by Citroën in April 1958 due to the high tariff barriers that protected Spain's domestic auto-makers.

== History ==
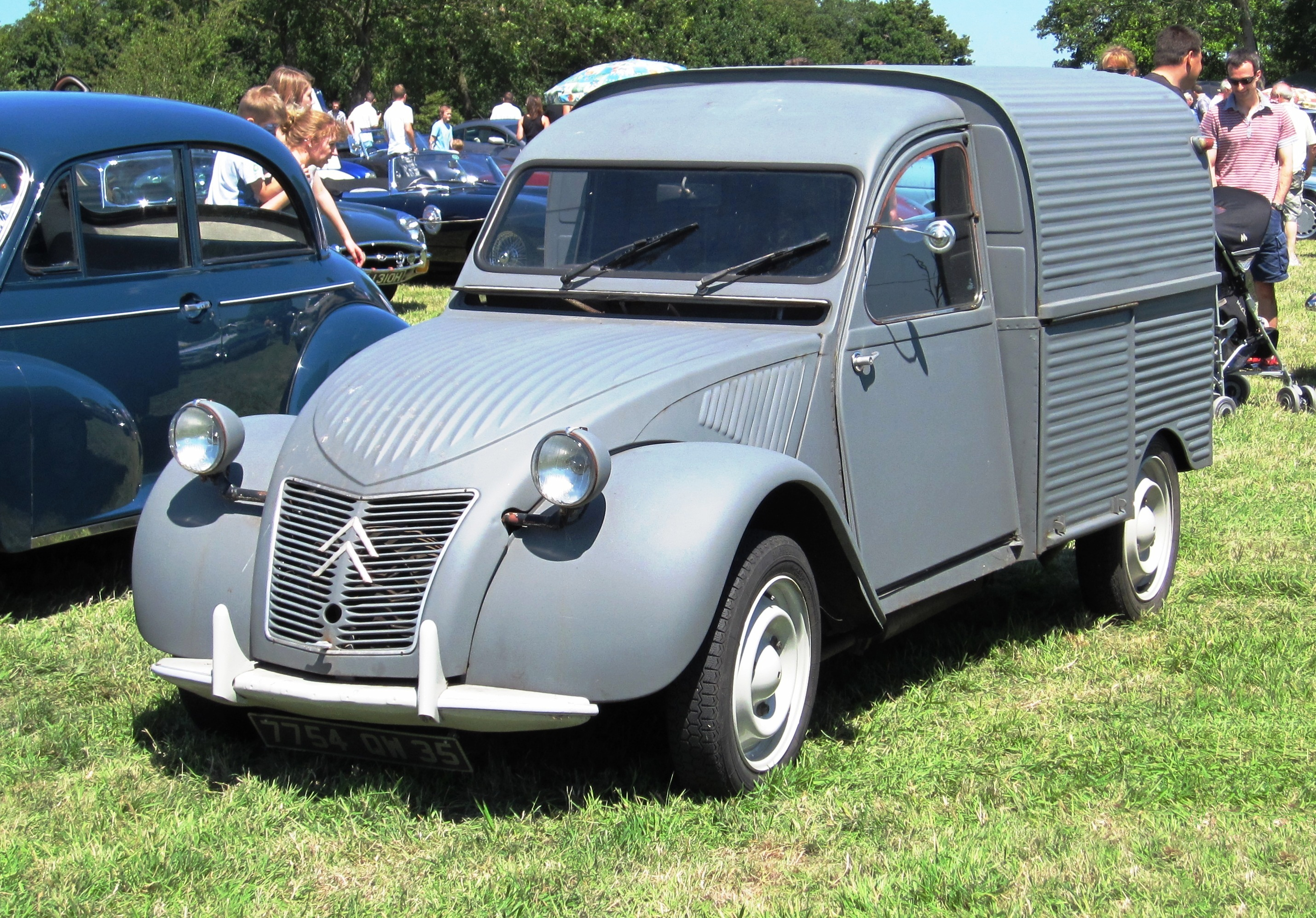
Citroën 2CV van

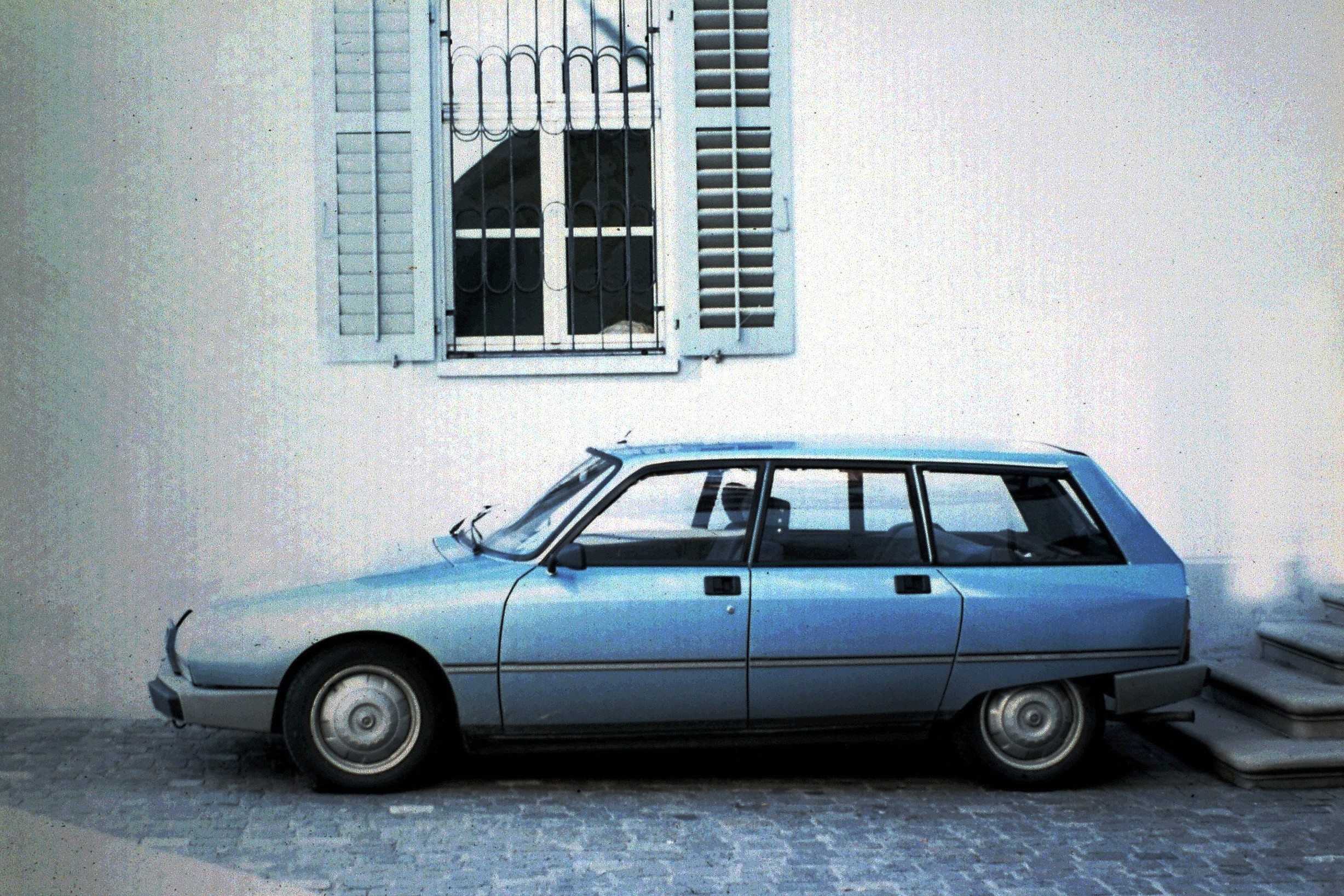
Citroën GSA Break

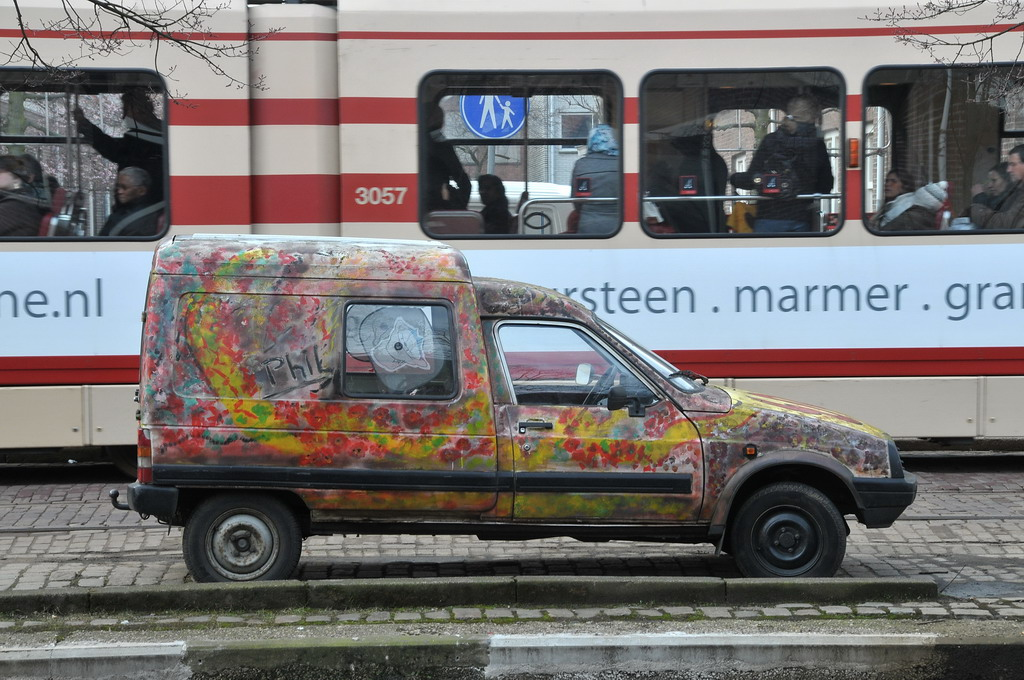
A graffitied Citroën C15 in The Hague, Netherlands

"Citroën Hispania" initially employed around 100 individuals. The selection of Vigo was influenced by its port and tax incentives from a "freeport" zone created by Francisco Franco. The first vehicle manufactured was the Furgoneta AZU, a locally assembled Citroën 2CV van, with the passenger car version following a year later. The first-year production totaled 400 vehicles.

In August 1959, the operations moved to the nearby Balaídos district, marking a phase of gradual expansion as production increased to 1,700 vehicles. Production mainly catered to the domestic market due economic conditions and high mutual tariffs with neighboring countries. By 1960, production reached 3,600 vehicles with a workforce of about 500.

Vigo's production remained limited to the 2CV and its derivatives until the mid-size Citroën GS began production at the plant in 1971. Citroën's Vigo facility sustained moderate growth, with a record output of about 110,000 vehicles in 1975 and employment rising to about 6,000 individuals.

After Peugeot bought Citroën, the Peugeot 504 began production in Vigo in 1977, followed by the Peugeot 505. However, the bulk of production were Citroën cars such as the Citroën Visa, Citroën BX, Citroën AX, Citroën ZX, Citroën Xsara, Citroën Xsara Picasso and Citroën C4 Picasso.

About 1.1 million units of the Citroën C15 van were produced from 1984 to 2005. The Citroën Berlingo and Peugeot Partner began production in 1996.

== Site ==
The 66-hectare (160-acre) site includes factory units covering panel stamping, welding, painting and assembly.

== Production ==
In 2005 Vigo produced 422,950 vehicles and 46,410 CKD kits. By 2007, supported by the success of the second generation Citroën Picasso, the plant reported a record output of 547,000, grouped into three production teams.

Centro de Vigo site produced 497,000 vehicles in 2020 and 495,400 in 2021.
