= Fiat 242 =

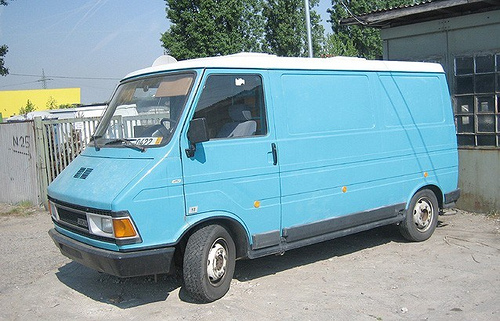
- Fiat 242

Overview
- Manufacturer: Fiat
- Also called: Citroën C35
- Production: 1974–1987 (Fiat); 1987–1992 (Chausson)

Body and chassis
- Class: Van (M)
- Layout: FF layout

Chronology
- Predecessor: Fiat 238; Fiat 241; Citroën K
- Successor: Fiat Ducato

The Fiat 242 is a van which was produced by Fiat from 1974.

== Overview ==
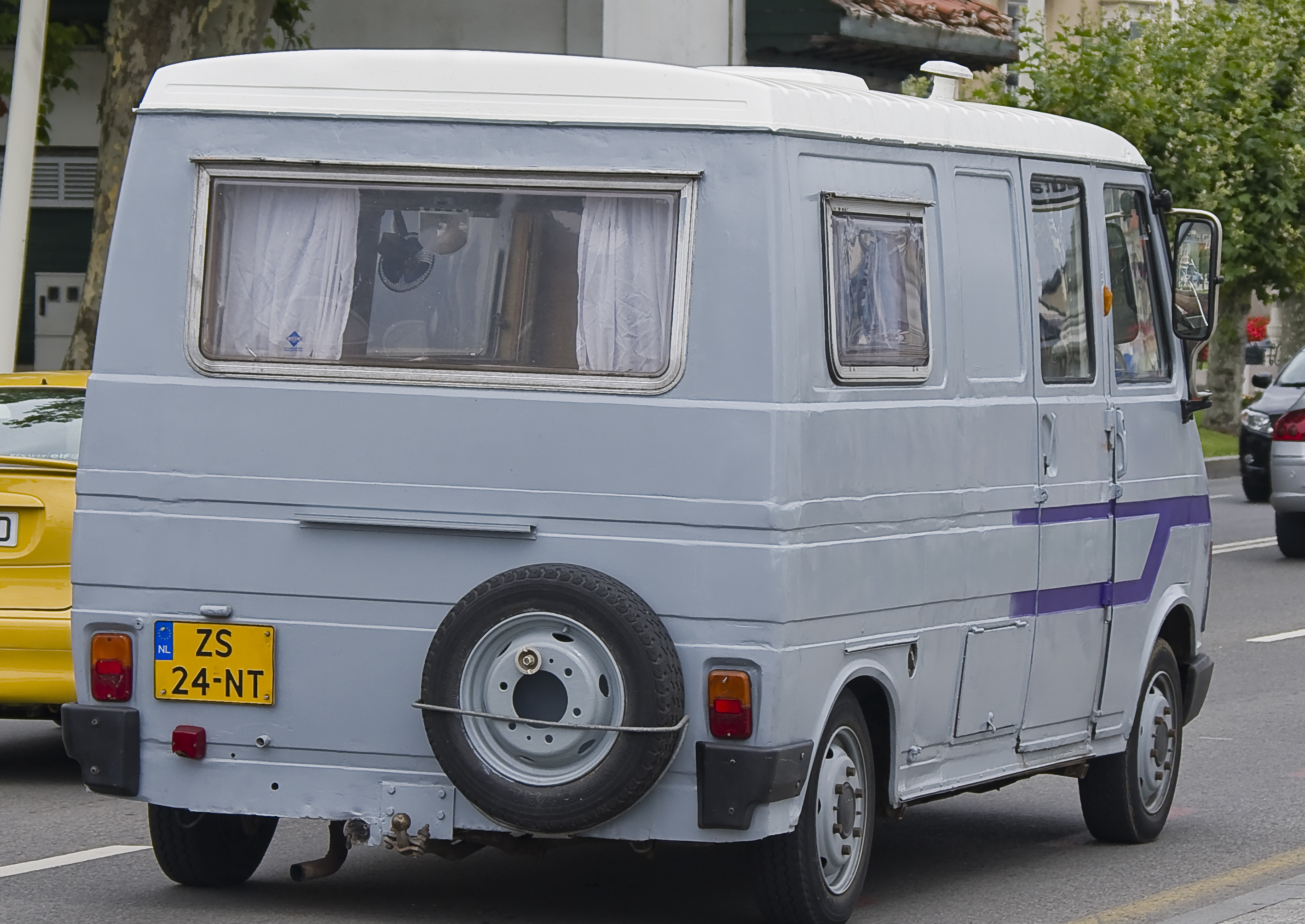
1983 Fiat 242 rear view

The 242 van was the result of a cooperation with Citroën and was sold under the name Citroën C35 in France. Both vehicles were produced in Italy until 1987 with Fiat engines, and then in France by Chausson, when Fiat discontinued the 242. Citroën retained the model until 1992. This cooperation was the precursor of Sevel.

== Citroën C35 ==
The C35 shares the same platform as the Fiat 242. The first diesel engine available that had been used in the C35 since 1973, the 2.2 L (2200 cc) diesel inline-four engine is shared with the Citroën CX 2200 D.

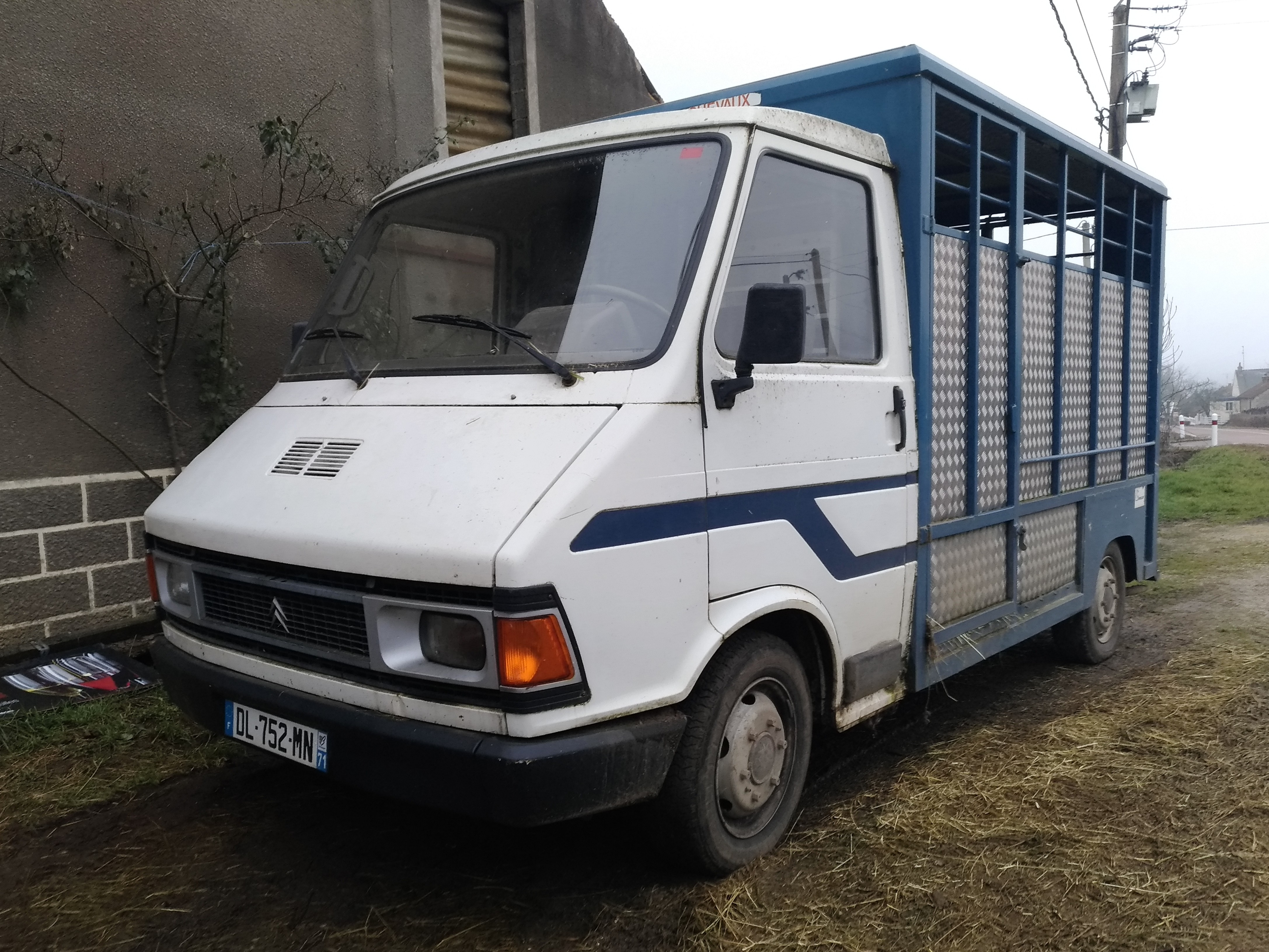
Citroën C35 truck

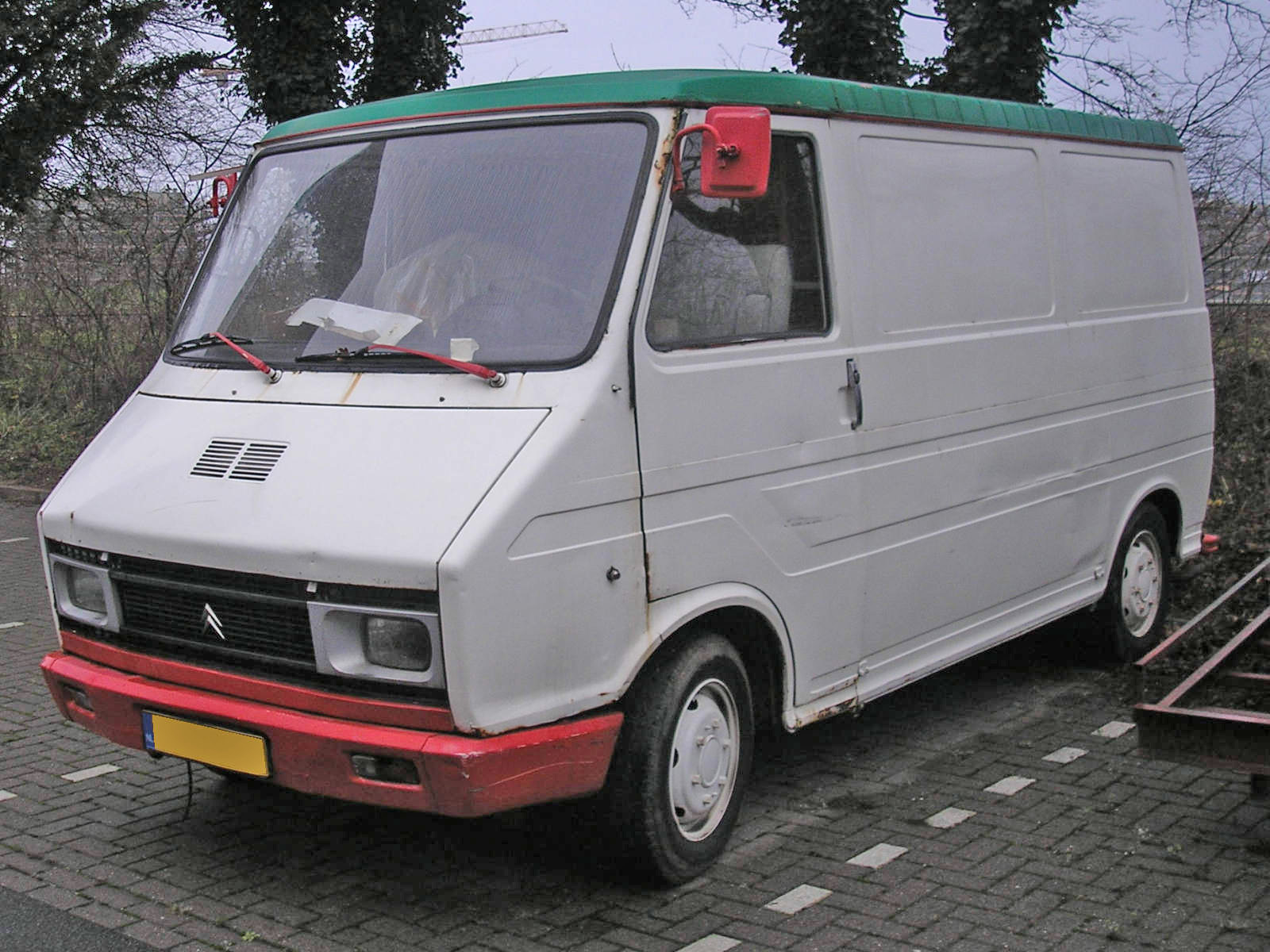
Citroën C35 pre-facelift (1980)
