= Stellantis Tafraoui Plant =

Car factory in Tafraoui, Algeria

Stellantis Oran Plant
- Built: December 2023
- Location: Zip code: 31140; Tafraoui, Oran Province, Algeria
- Owner: Stellantis

The Stellantis Tafraoui Plant is an automotive assembly plant based in Tafraoui, Oran, Algeria.

== History ==
It opened in December 2023 and is currently producing Fiat cars. The facility area is 32.3ha size and can produce 90,000 units per year. In 2024, 40,000 vehicles were produced by SKD, and then 90,000 units will be produced by 2026, and the localization rate is expected to increase to 35%. In the meantime, in 2024, the 10% integrated localization rate was achieved.

In 2023, Algeria had 500 direct job creation effects, and the goal is to create 2,000 jobs by the end of 2024 and 2,000 jobs by 2026. Considering the company's jobs in the future, it is possible to enjoy more than 1,600 indirect profits. In addition, it is also strengthening the local industry-academia linkage, and in cooperation with the ISTA of Oran University of Science and Technology (ISTA), the company has a new master's program for Algeria's first 'production unit management' or cooperation with the Oran National Poly Technic School (ENPO) It is known that it will establish a professional program for the machinery industry to provide students with opportunities to experience the factory.

It is expected to become a major export base for Stellantis in the Middle East and Africa.

To meet government requirements for car manufacturing, the company began expanding its plant in March 2024 to add bodywork and painting facilities. This enhancement will allow the facility to shift to CKD (Completely Knocked Down) production, enabling complete assembly from individual components. CKD production at the plant officially began in September 2025, with the completion of the painting and welding facilities, and the beginning of assembly of Fiat's Grande Panda model.

By March 2026, the plant reached a total of 80,000 cars built, and in April 2026, construction of a second expansion began, which is planned to bring annual production to 135,000 vehicles by 2028.

== Products ==
=== Current ===
- Fiat Doblò (2024–present)
- Fiat Grande Panda (2025–present)

=== Past ===
- Fiat 500 (2023–2025)
