= Panel van =

Cargo vehicle based on passenger car chassis

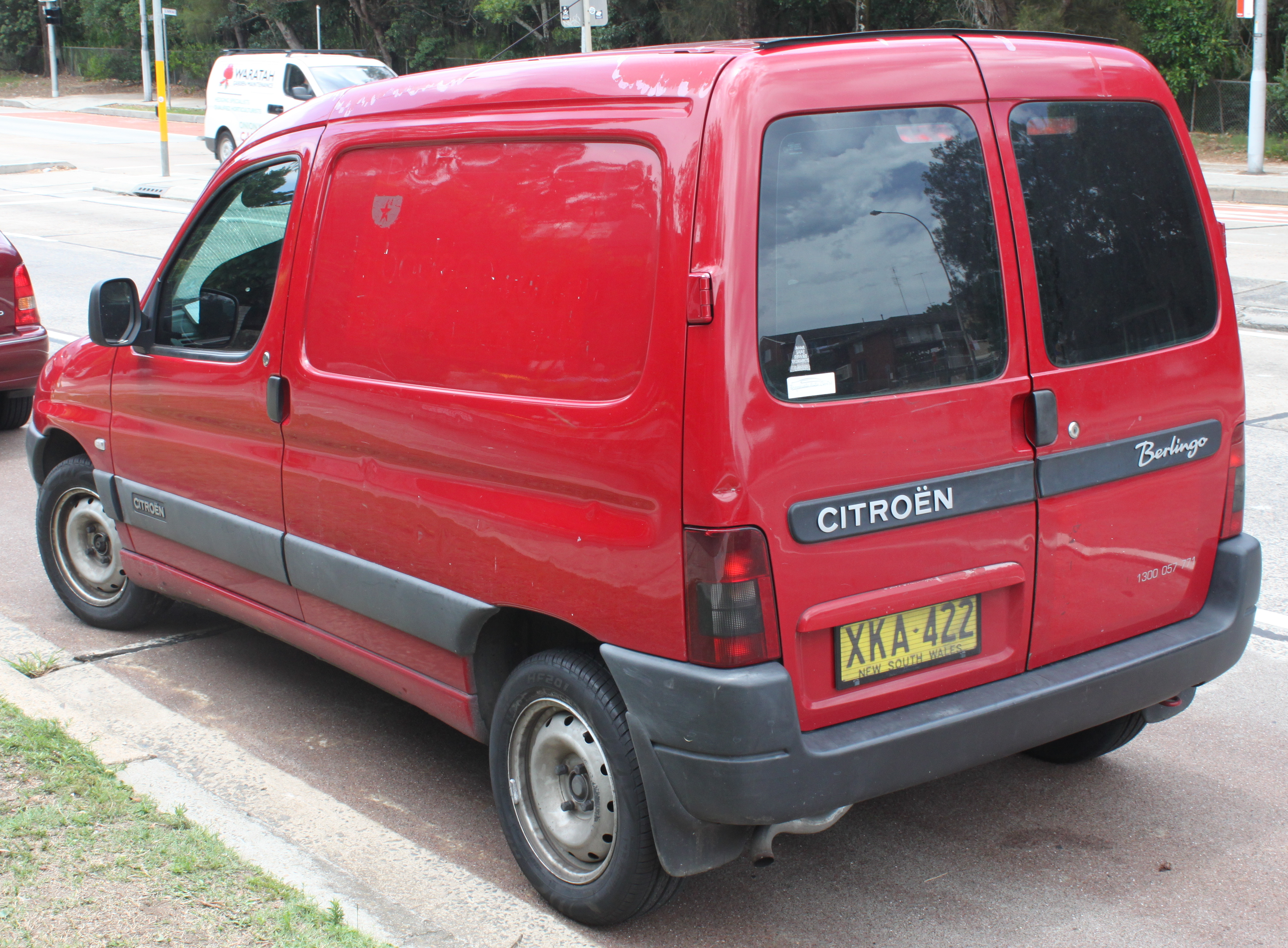
2001 Citroën Berlingo

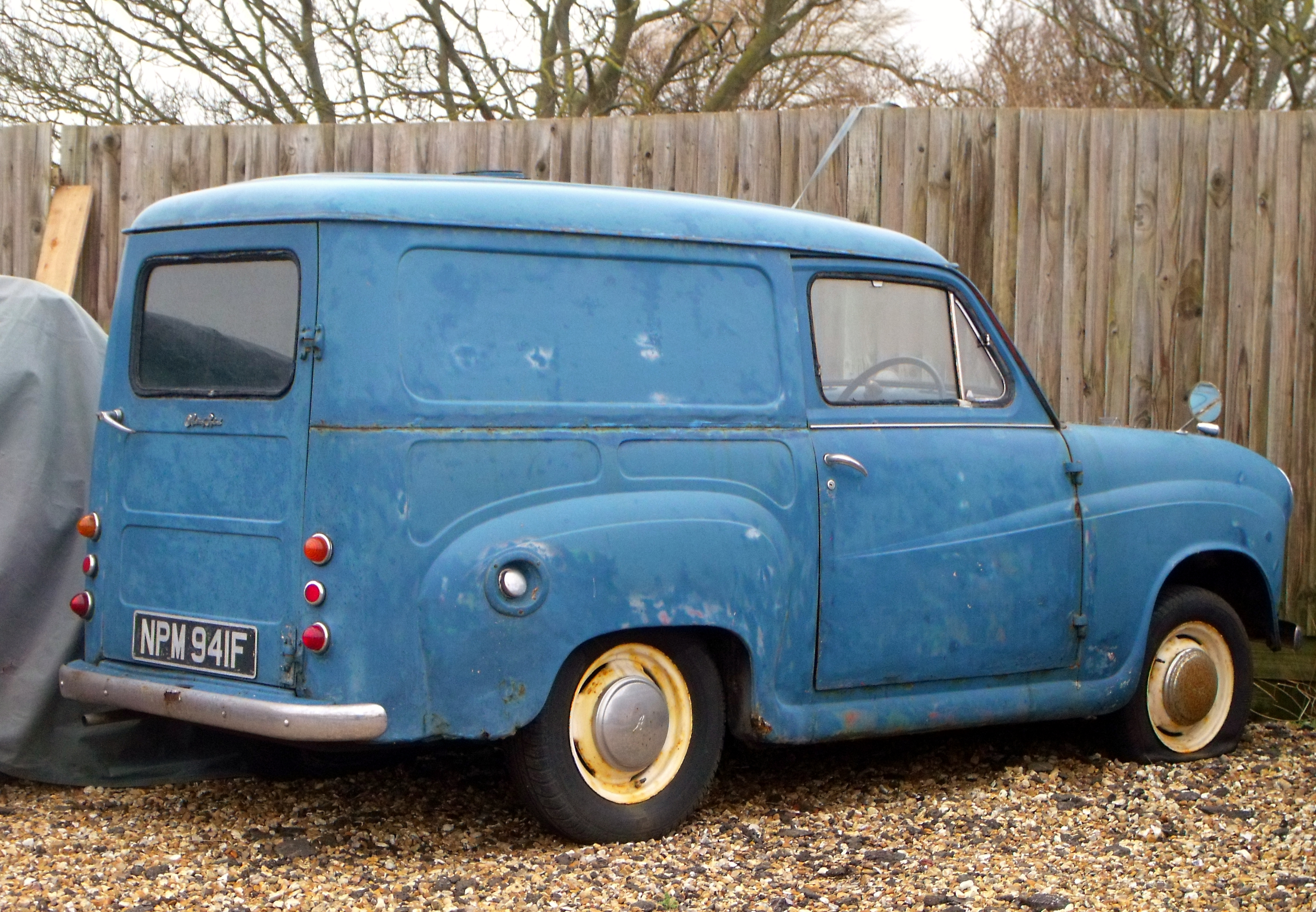
1960s Austin A35 delivery van

A panel van, also known as a delivery van (United Kingdom), blind van, car-derived van or sedan delivery (United States), is a small cargo vehicle with a passenger car chassis, typically with a single front bench seat and no side windows behind the B-pillar. Panel vans are smaller than panel trucks or cargo vans, both of which use body-on-frame truck chassis.

As they are derived from passenger cars, the development of panel vans is typically closely linked with the passenger car models upon which they depend. North American panel vans were initially based upon the two-door station wagon models, while Europe's narrower roads dictated that panel vans utilize the smaller donor chassis of subcompact cars in that market. In Australia, panel vans were a development of the ute, a small pickup truck based on a passenger car chassis, e.g. Holden Ute, often using the longer wheelbase of a station wagon chassis.

== Origins ==
1931 Ford Model A Sedan Delivery

Panel vans were a well-established body type by the end of the 1920s.

Panel vans have experienced divergent evolution in America, Europe, and Australia, as a result of the different passenger car platforms upon which panel vans are based in each region.

== North America ==
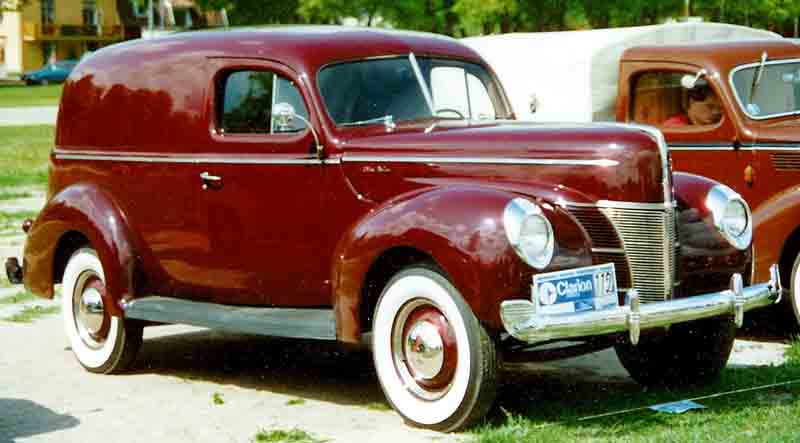
1940 Ford De Luxe Sedan Delivery

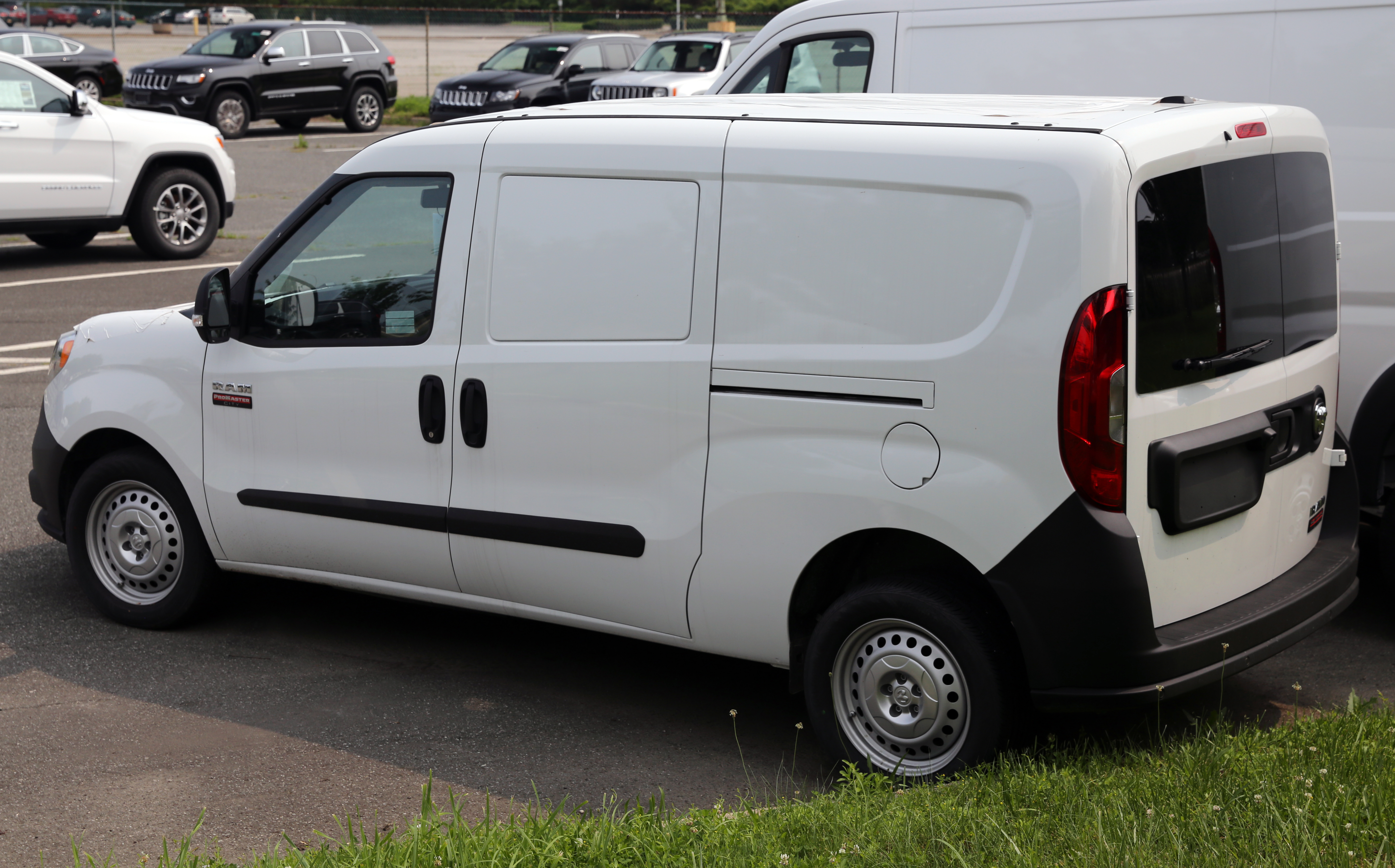
2015 Ram ProMaster City Tradesman Cargo Van

A panel van is often known as a "delivery" or "sedan delivery" in North America. It is an older term that usually only applies to station wagon–based vehicles (sedan deliveries/delivery wagons) such as the Chevrolet Delray and Ford Courier, or pickup-based vans (panel deliveries). Large, boxy unibody vans based on truck platforms (such as the Ford Transit, Ram ProMaster, and Chevrolet Express) as well as smaller unibody vans (like the Ford Transit Connect and Ram Promaster City) are usually referred to as cargo vans or just panel vans. Larger vehicles built on a chassis cab with a custom cargo box are usually called box trucks or moving vans.

In the late 1920s, Ford produced "Town Car Delivery" and "Wood Panel Delivery" as part of the Ford Model A model range. Later Plymouth produced a sedan delivery from 1935 until 1941. Pontiac produced deliveries until 1953 in the U.S. and until 1958 in Canada based on the Pontiac Pathfinder. Sedan delivery models were usually produced in small quantities of 200 or less, for example 449 Canadian Pontiac sedan deliveries were built in 1958.

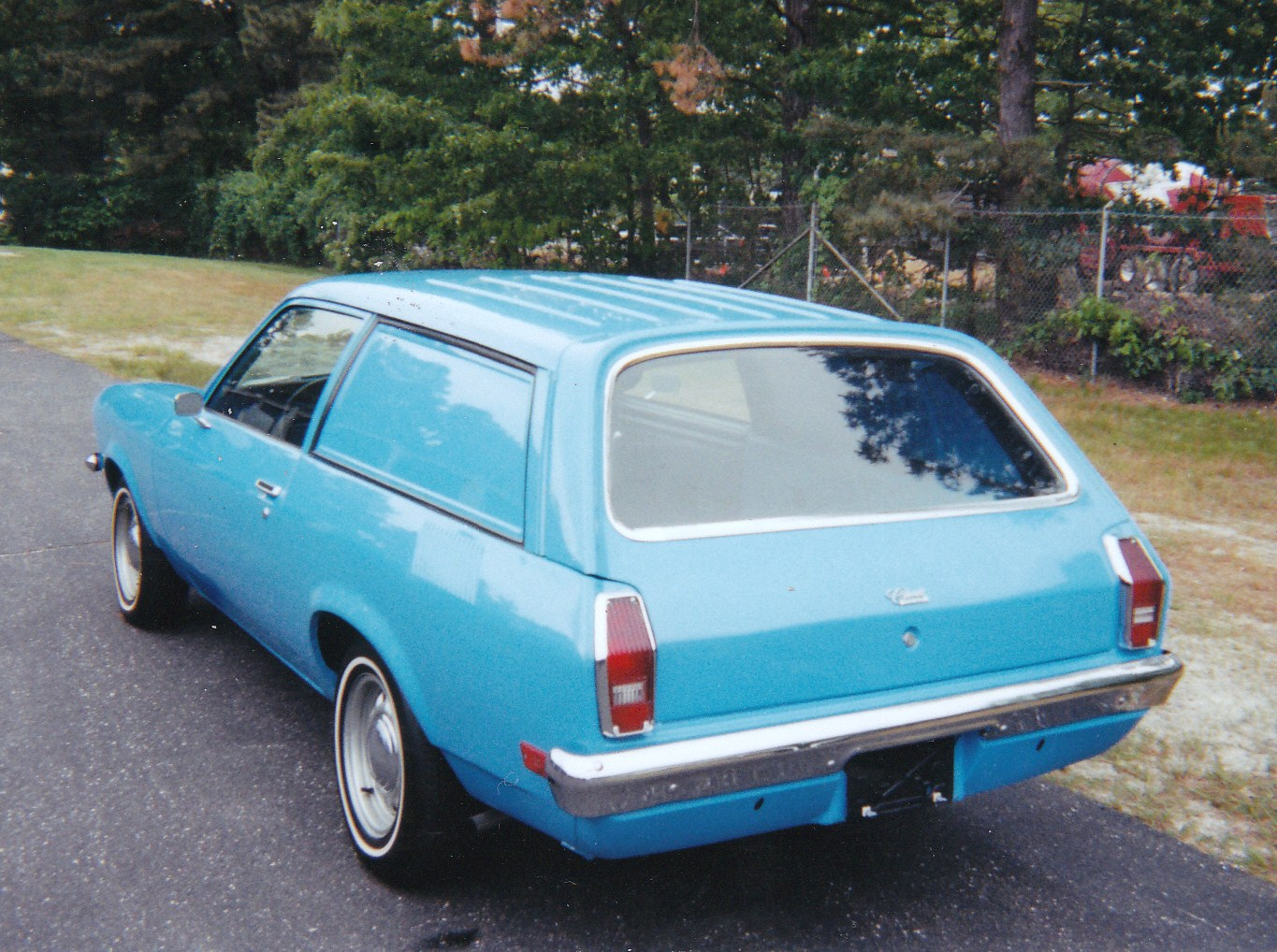
1971 Chevrolet Vega Panel Express

From 1959 on, the sedan delivery was no longer practical; it was phased out in 1960 as a Chevrolet model, so the requisite Chevrolet body was no longer available. With the growing sales of the Volkswagen Type 2 and the introduction of compact vans, sedan deliveries faded from the scene. Chevrolet dropped the body type after 1960, while Ford moved it to the Falcon line-up until 1965.

In the 1970s, Chevrolet and Ford offered subcompact sedan deliveries with the Chevrolet Vega Panel Express and the Ford Pinto Panel Wagon. The Vega Panel Express was introduced in September 1970 and it was Chevy's first sedan delivery in ten years since the final full-size model was offered in 1960. The Vega Panel Express body style accounted for less than 2% of the total Chevrolet Vegas produced during the 1971 through 1975 model years. First-year sales of the Vega Panel Express peaked at 7,800 units and after leveling off to 4,000 units per year, only 1,525 were sold in 1975. The Pontiac Astre Panel, Pontiac's version of the Vega Panel Express, was available in Canada in the 1973–75 model years and in the US for 1975. The Pinto Panel Wagon was introduced in 1976 and was offered in both a commercial and a "factory customized" Pinto Cruising Wagon version that featured a round porthole style window on each side. The Ford Courier name, previously used for Ford sedan delivery vans, began to be used with Ford's import pickup truck line.

In 2002, Chrysler showed a concept car edition of a panel van based on the PT Cruiser at the North American International Auto Show, but it was not manufactured. In 2007 Chevrolet released a panel van version of the HHR, marketed as the HHR Panel.

The small cargo vans currently sold by American manufacturers are from their overseas divisions, for example, the Ford Transit Connect and Ram ProMaster City; however, both vehicles are planned to be discontinued by their respective manufacturers by 2023 due to lackluster sales.

== Europe ==
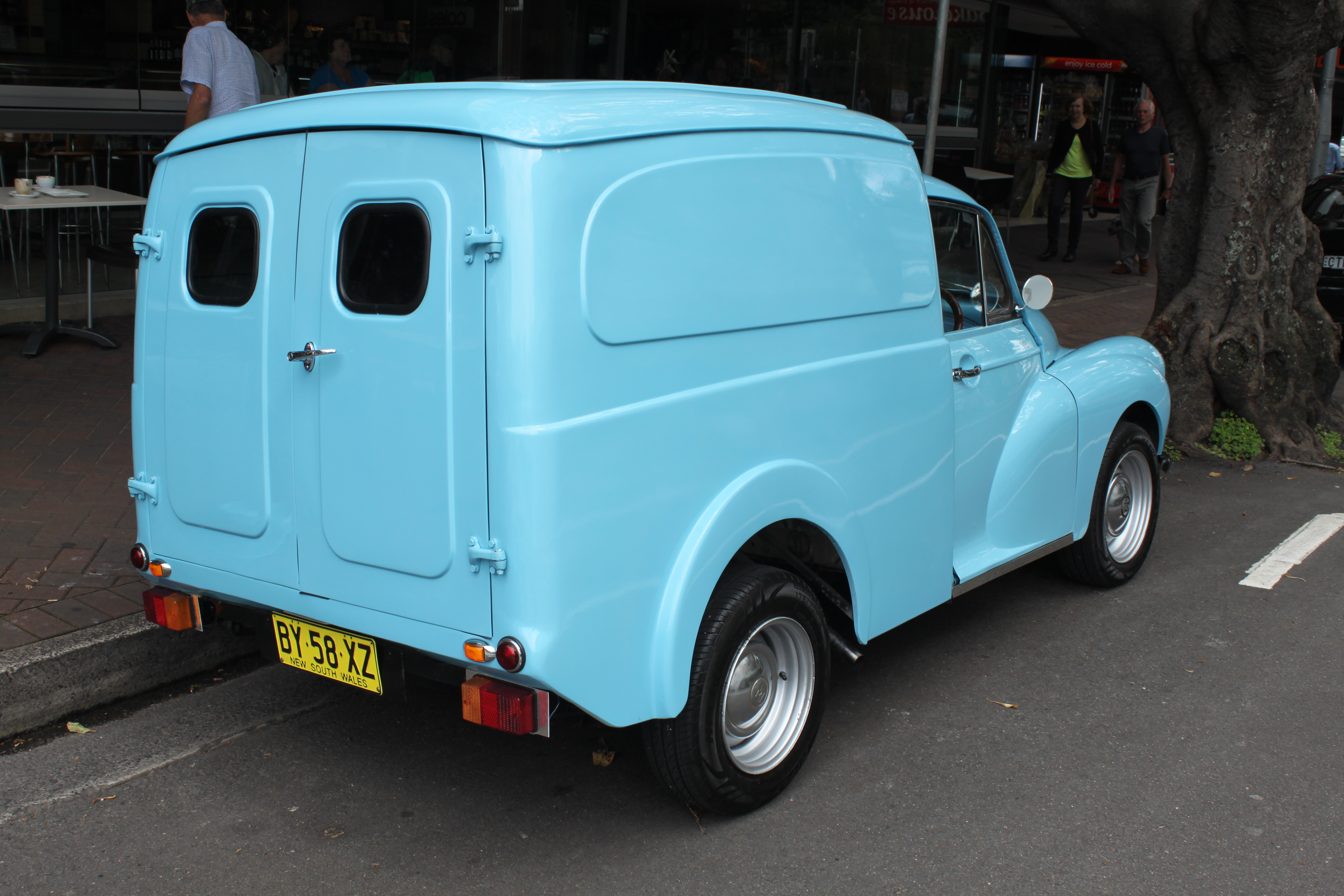
1958 Morris Minor 1000 panel van

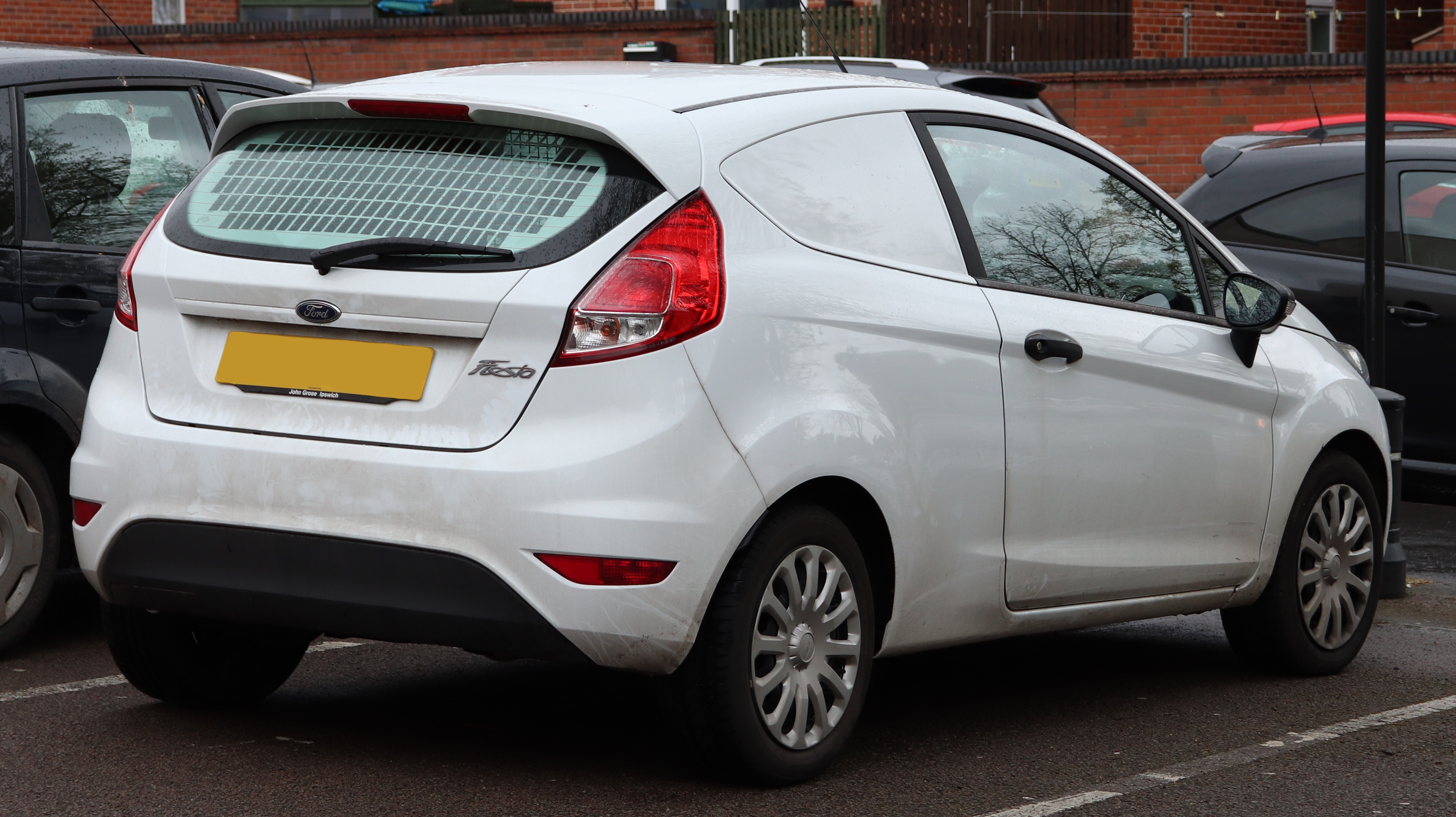
2017 Ford Fiesta Delivery

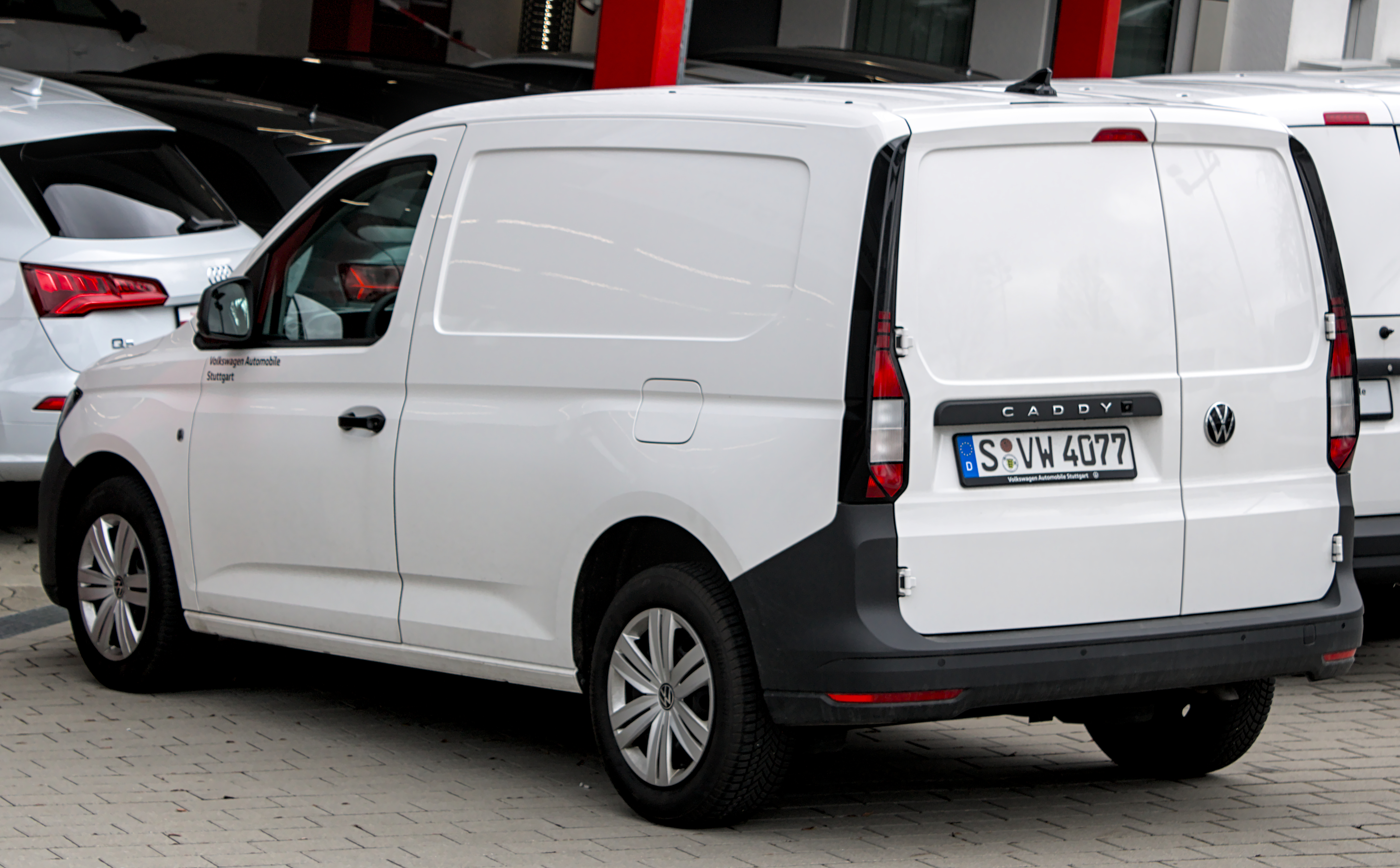
2021 Volkswagen Caddy

European panel vans of the 20th century include the Citroën 2CV Fourgonnette, Citroën H Van, Citroën C15, Ford Escort, Morris Minor, Renault Estafette, SEAT Inca and more recently the Renault Kangoo and the Opel Combo.

From the 1950s onwards, a larger alternative to the panel van was the van (based on a commercial vehicle chassis instead of a passenger car chassis), such as the Volkswagen Type 2, the DKW van and the first-generation Ford Transit in 1965.

In the United Kingdom, panel vans benefit from having lower taxes than estate cars and do not have the speed restrictions that apply to larger vans. This has given rise to some anomalies. Authorities and dealers are not always certain about what qualifies as a car-derived van. SUVs and crossovers are also popularly turned into light commercial vehicles without rear seats.

Examples of panel vans from the last 30 years are the Renault Kangoo (1997), the Fiat Doblò (2001), Opel Combo (2001), Ford Transit Connect (2002) and the Volkswagen Caddy (2004). They are also purpose-designed to be utilitarian base model MPVs / people carriers, for a range of such vehicles. Since the 1980s most manufacturers have offered light van versions of their small hatchbacks, sharing bodywork with the regular passenger version. These versions have the rear seats removed and may have blanked rear windows, depending on local regulations.

As of 2019, the market consists of the following models and many more:

- Citroën Berlingo
- Dacia Dokker
- Fiat Fiorino
- Fiat Doblò
- Ford Fiesta Sport Van
- Ford Transit Courier
- Ford Transit Custom
- Mercedes-Benz Citan
- Nissan NV200
- Opel/Vauxhall Combo
- Peugeot Partner
- Renault Kangoo
- Toyota ProAce City
- Volkswagen Caddy

== Australia ==
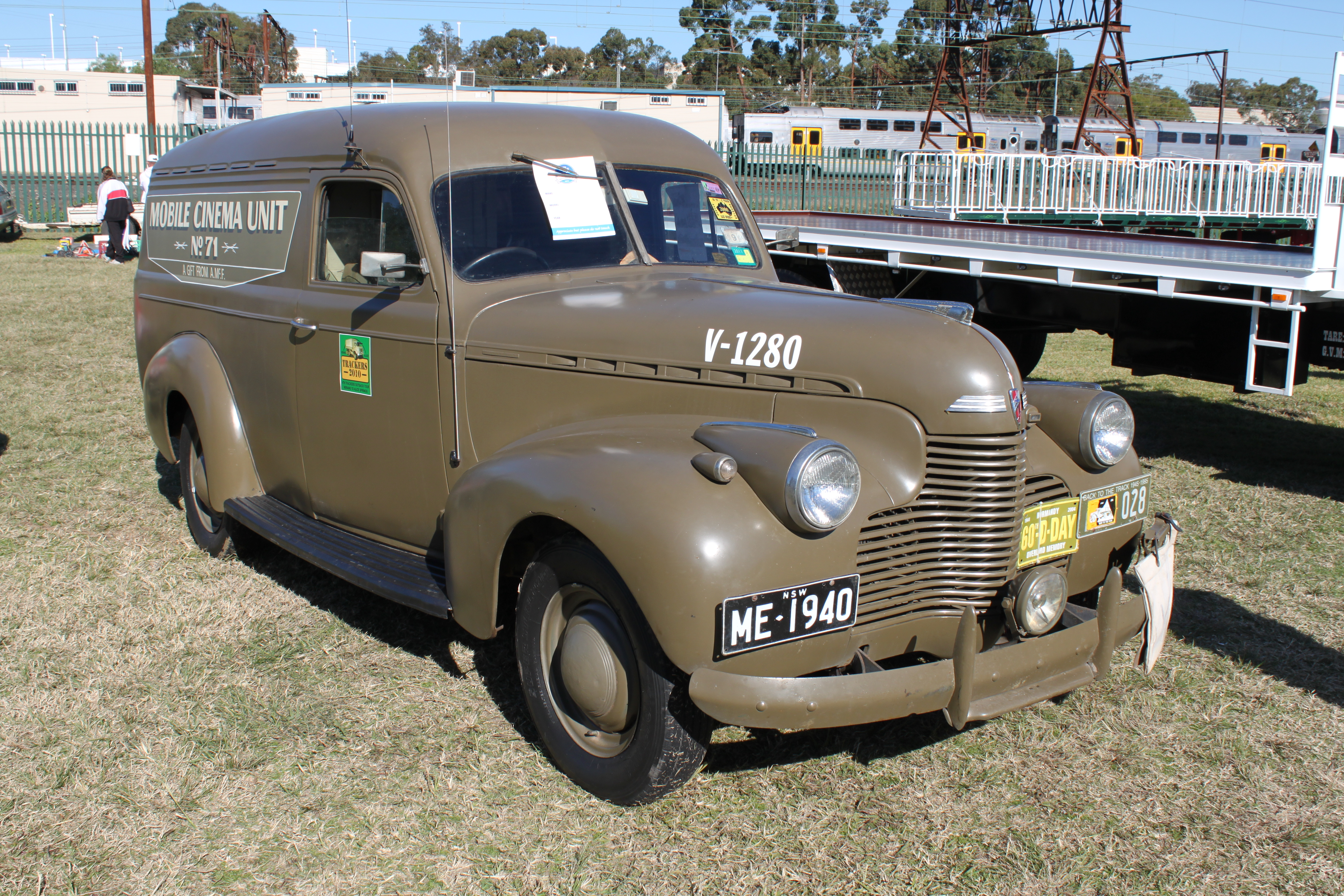
1940 Chevrolet Pullman panel van

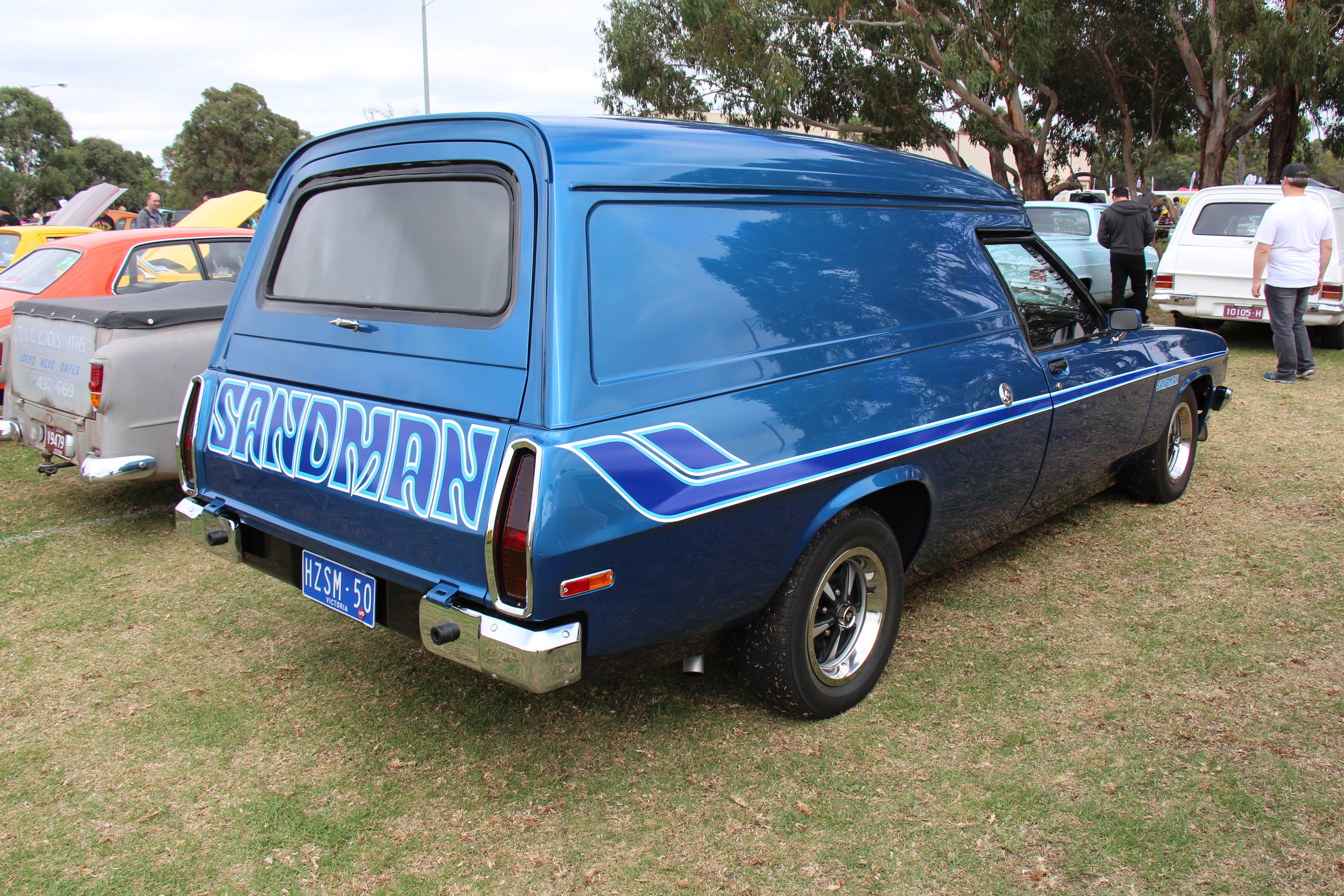
1980 Holden HZ Sandman panel van

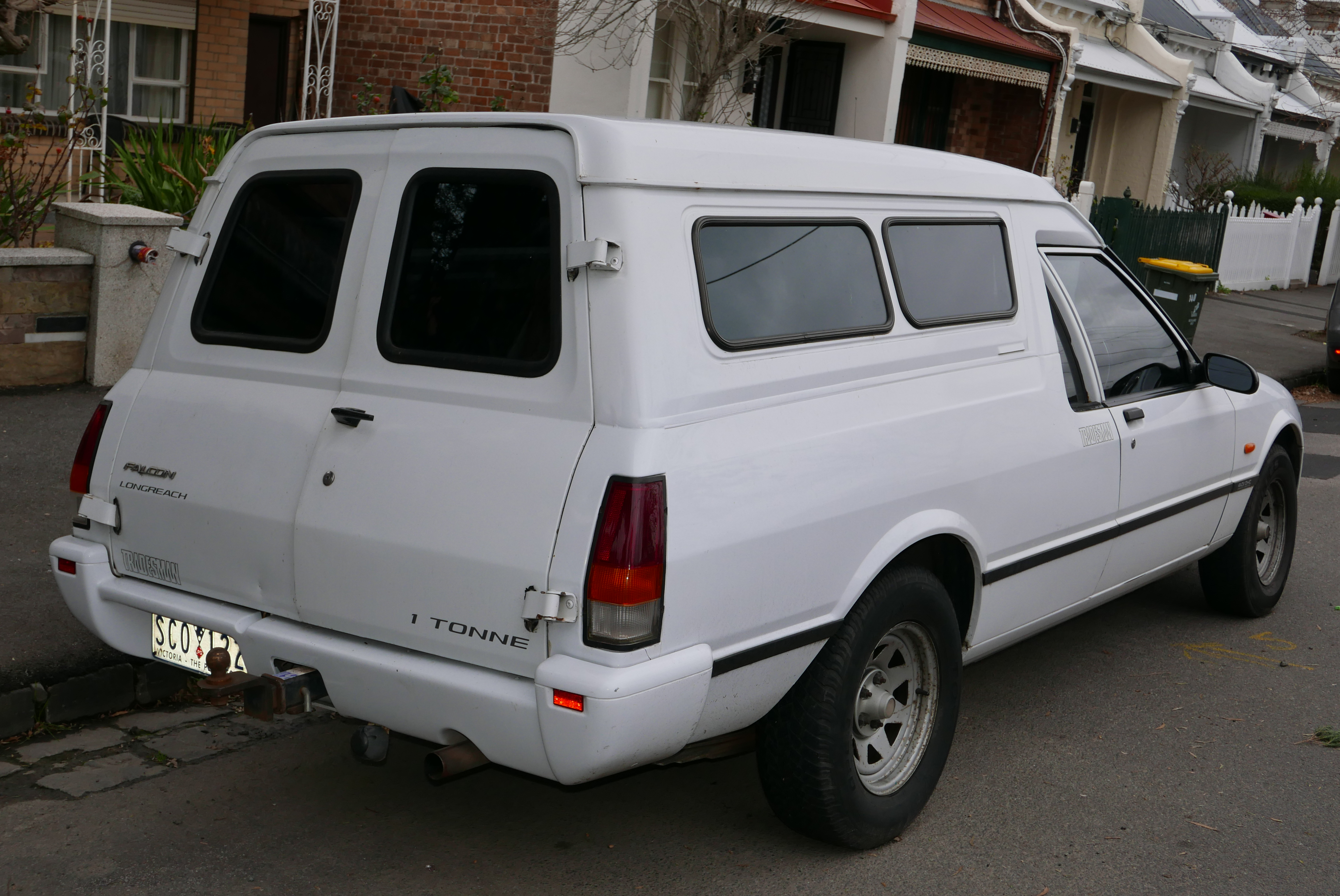
1998 Ford XH Falcon panel van

The first Holden panel van produced in Australia was the FJ Holden, which was released in December 1953, although many manufacturers offered panel vans in their range prior to this. Like many Australian panel vans, it was based on a corresponding ute and station wagon models. In May 1961, Ford Australia released a panel van version of the XK Falcon, marketed as the "sedan delivery" body style. The first panel van by Chrysler Valiant was part of the CL Valiant model range and was introduced in April 1977.

Panel vans' combination of cargo space and customisable interior in a relatively compact vehicle made them attractive to painters, electricians, general labourers and film crews. Australian police forces also used panel vans (nicknamed "divvy vans" or "paddywagons").

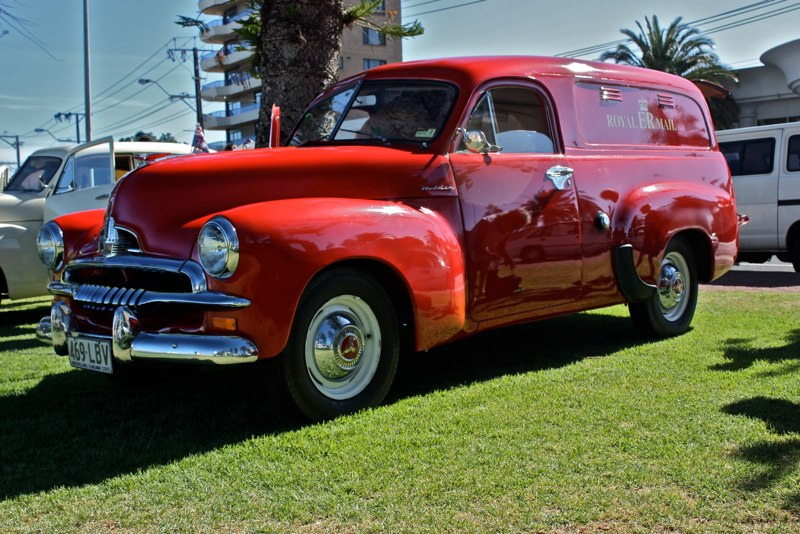
1953 Holden FJ panel van

Early Australian panel vans used swing-down and -up tailgates and a standard roof height, indicative of their ute and station wagon/sedan delivery origins. In the mid 60s first Holden, then Ford introduced unique rooflines to their panelvan models. These were higher than the previous stagion wagon based roof, giving greater cargo space and functionality. In the early 70s, Ford introduced horizontally opening rear doors (nicknamed "barn doors").

By the early 1970s, when panel vans were in decline in America, they had become cultural icons in Australia. The most popular model was the Holden Sandman, which was marketed to surfing lifestyle. The first Sandman was built in small quantities in 1974 in the HQ model range, but the model's popularity greatly increased in the subsequent HJ generation, which was released in October 1974. In the 1979 movie Mad Max, a modified 1975 HJ Sandman model was one of the vehicles driven by the lead character (played by Mel Gibson).

Ford's competitor to the Sandman was the Surferoo, which was introduced into the XB Falcon model range in 1973. In 1977, the Surferoo was replaced by the more popular Sundowner, in the XC Falcon range. The traditional tailgate style doors were also reintroduced as an option with the XC range.

In 1976, Chrysler released a similar model called the Drifter, which was part of the Chrysler CL Valiant product range. The Drifter ceased production in 1978.

Younger drivers were especially attracted to panel vans, not least because of the ease with which a mattress could be installed within the cargo bay. Consequently, panel vans also attracted nicknames such as "sin bins," and "shaggin' wagons". During the 1970s many Australian panel van owners took to applying airbrush mural art to the sides of their vans, paralleling a similar trend in America. Along with Volkswagen Kombi micro-busses, panel vans were popular with surfers, who could sleep in the cargo bay while carrying surfboards on the roof.

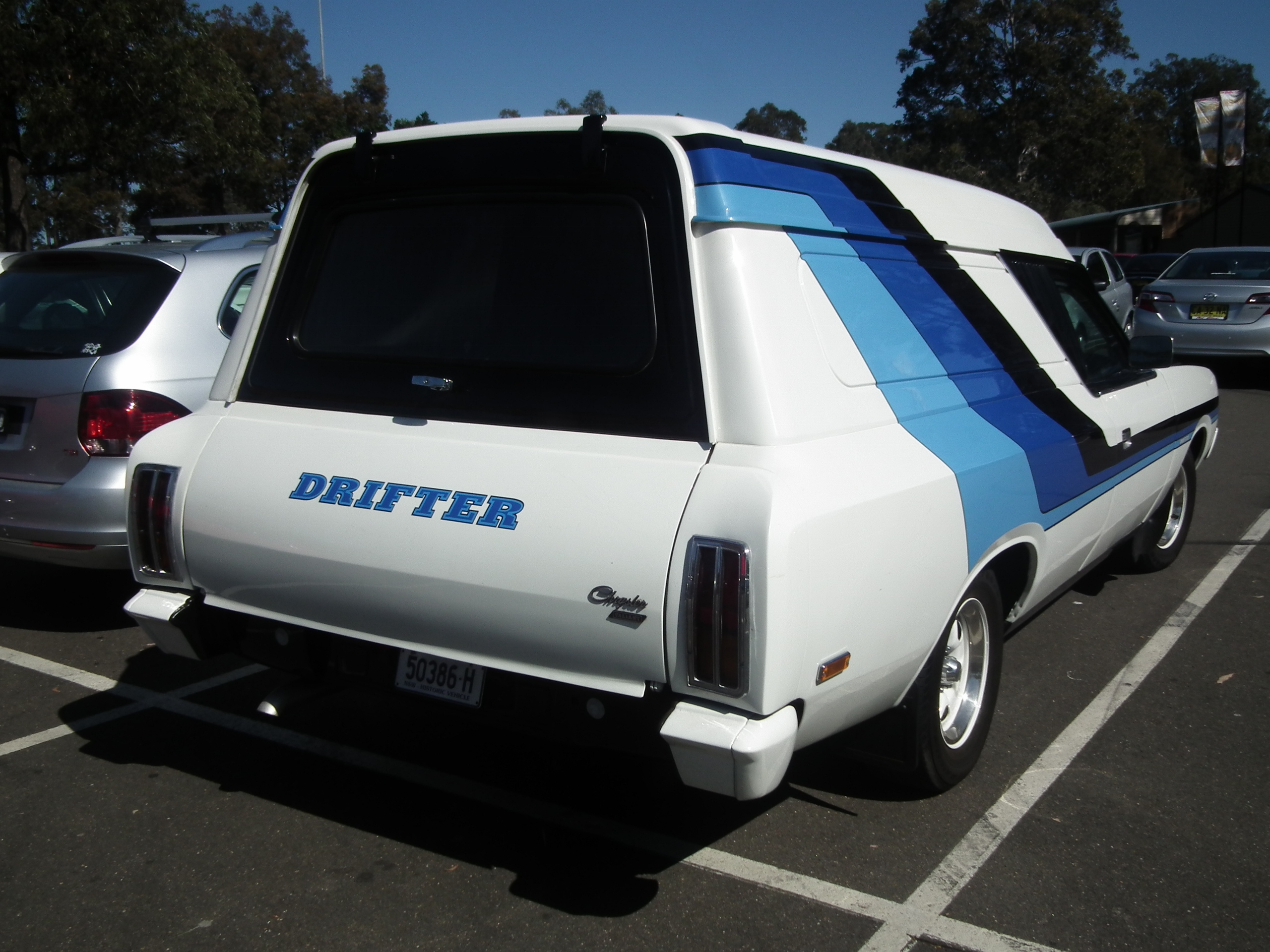
1977 Chrysler CL Valiant Drifter panel van

By the end of 1979, the Sandman had largely lost its place in the contemporary Australian youth culture – order figures were down and many of the vehicles were now being sold with the stripes and tailgate logos deleted. The final Sandman was in the Holden HZ series and featured V8 engines only, along with a four-headlight grille and under bumper front spoiler. In 1979, a basic HZ Holden panel van was priced at A$6,076, with the Sandman option package an additional A$1,700. If a buyer selected every Sandman extra, which would cost in excess of 50% more than a basic HZ panel van, Holden would include a velvet mattress with the Holden logo embroidered. The Sandman ute and panel van were phased out in October 1979, with the end of the HZ series.

Panel vans generally declined in popularity through the 1980s. Holden's last panel van, the WB, ceased production in 1984. Ford was the last manufacturer of Australian panel vans, until production of the XH Falcon, ceased in 1999.

In 2000, Holden unveiled a retro-styled Sandman show car based on the Holden VU Ute. While this Sandman was never released, a canopy or "camper shell" featuring the same styling was made available as an A$6,150 accessory for Holden utes from 2003 through 2006. Installation was complicated, however, and the rear window and cab wall of the ute were retained, preventing movement between the cargo bay and the passenger cab as was possible in purpose-built panel vans.

== See also ==
- Car body style
- Coupé utility
- Light commercial vehicle
- Panel truck, built on a truck chassis, a panel truck is usually larger than a panel van
- Pickup truck

== Explanatory notes ==
1. The Holden panel van is an exception to the unibody rule of panel vans; however, it is not excluded as its ladder chassis is an adaptation of a unibody passenger car design, and size, towing and ride height classifications to suit.
