= International Van of the Year =

Annual award

The International Van of the Year is an annual award made by the international transport sector. Each year, an expert jury consisting of leading, authoritative specialist journalists selects the International Van of the Year from the new vehicles appearing on the market in Europe.

== Results ==
- 2026 Kia PV5
- 2025 Renault Master
- 2024 Ford Transit Custom
- 2023 Volkswagen ID. Buzz Cargo
- 2022 Renault Kangoo and Mercedes-Benz Citan
- 2021 Groupe PSA (Stellantis) electric vans (Citroën e-Jumpy, Peugeot e-Expert, Opel/Vauxhall Vivaro-e and Toyota Proace Electric)
- 2020 Ford Transit Custom
- 2019 Groupe PSA (Peugeot Partner, Citroën Berlingo, Opel/Vauxhall Combo Cargo and Toyota Proace City)
- 2018 Iveco Daily Blue Power
- 2017 Volkswagen Crafter
- 2016 Volkswagen Transporter T6
- 2015 Iveco Daily
- 2014 Ford Transit Connect
- 2013 Ford Transit Custom
- 2012 Renault Kangoo Z.E.
- 2011 Fiat Doblò
- 2010 Nissan NV200
- 2009 Sevel/Tofaş vans (Fiat Fiorino, Peugeot Bipper and Citroën Nemo)
- 2008 Sevel vans (Fiat Scudo, Peugeot Expert and Citroën Jumpy/Dispatch)
- 2007 Ford Transit
- 2006 Fiat Doblò
- 2005 Mercedes-Benz Vito
- 2004 Volkswagen Transporter T5
- 2003 Ford Transit Connect
- 2002 Renault Trafic, Nissan Primastar and Opel/Vauxhall Vivaro
- 2001 Ford Transit
- 2000 Iveco Daily
- 1999 Opel/Vauxhall Movano
- 1998 Renault Master
- 1997 Peugeot Partner and Citroën Berlingo
- 1996 Mercedes-Benz Vito
- 1995 Mercedes-Benz Sprinter
- 1994 Sevel vans (Fiat Ducato, Peugeot Boxer and Citroën Jumper/Relay)
- 1993 Nissan Sunny Van
- 1992 Volkswagen Transporter T4

Winners Sorted By Brand/Manufacturer
| (Turkey) Ford | 7 | Transit (2001) | Transit Connect (2003) | Transit (2007) | Transit Custom (2013) | Transit Connect (2014) | Transit Custom (2020) | Transit Custom (2024) |
| (France) Citroën | 6 | Jumper (1994) | Berlingo (1997) | Jumpy (2008) | Nemo (2009) | Berlingo (2019) | e-Jumpy (2021) | |
| (Italy) Fiat | 5 | Ducato (1994) | Doblò (2006) | Scudo (2008) | Fiorino (2009) | Doblò (2011) | | |
| (Italy) Iveco | 3 | Daily (2000) | Daily (2015) | Daily Blue Power (2018) | | | | |
| (South Korea) Kia | 1 | PV5 (2026) | | | | | | |
| (Germany) Mercedes-Benz | 4 | Sprinter (1995) | Vito (1996) | Vito (2005) | Citan (2022) | | | |
| (Japan) Nissan | 2 | Sunny Van (1993) | NV200 (2010) | | | | | |
| (Germany) Opel | 4 | Opel/Vauxhall Movano (1999) | Vivaro (2002) | Combo (2019) | Vivaro-e (2021) | | | |
| (France) Peugeot | 6 | Boxer (1994) | Partner (1997) | Expert (2008) | Bipper (2009) | Partner (2019) | e-Expert (2021) | |
| (France) Renault | 5 | Master (1998) | Trafic (2002) | Kangoo Z.E. (2012) | Kangoo (2022) | Master (2025) | | |
| (Germany) Volkswagen | 5 | T4 (1992) | T5 (2004) | T6 (2016) | Crafter (2017) | ID. Buzz Cargo (2023) | | |

== See also ==
- List of motor vehicle awards
