= Fiat Doblò =

Minivan produced by Fiat

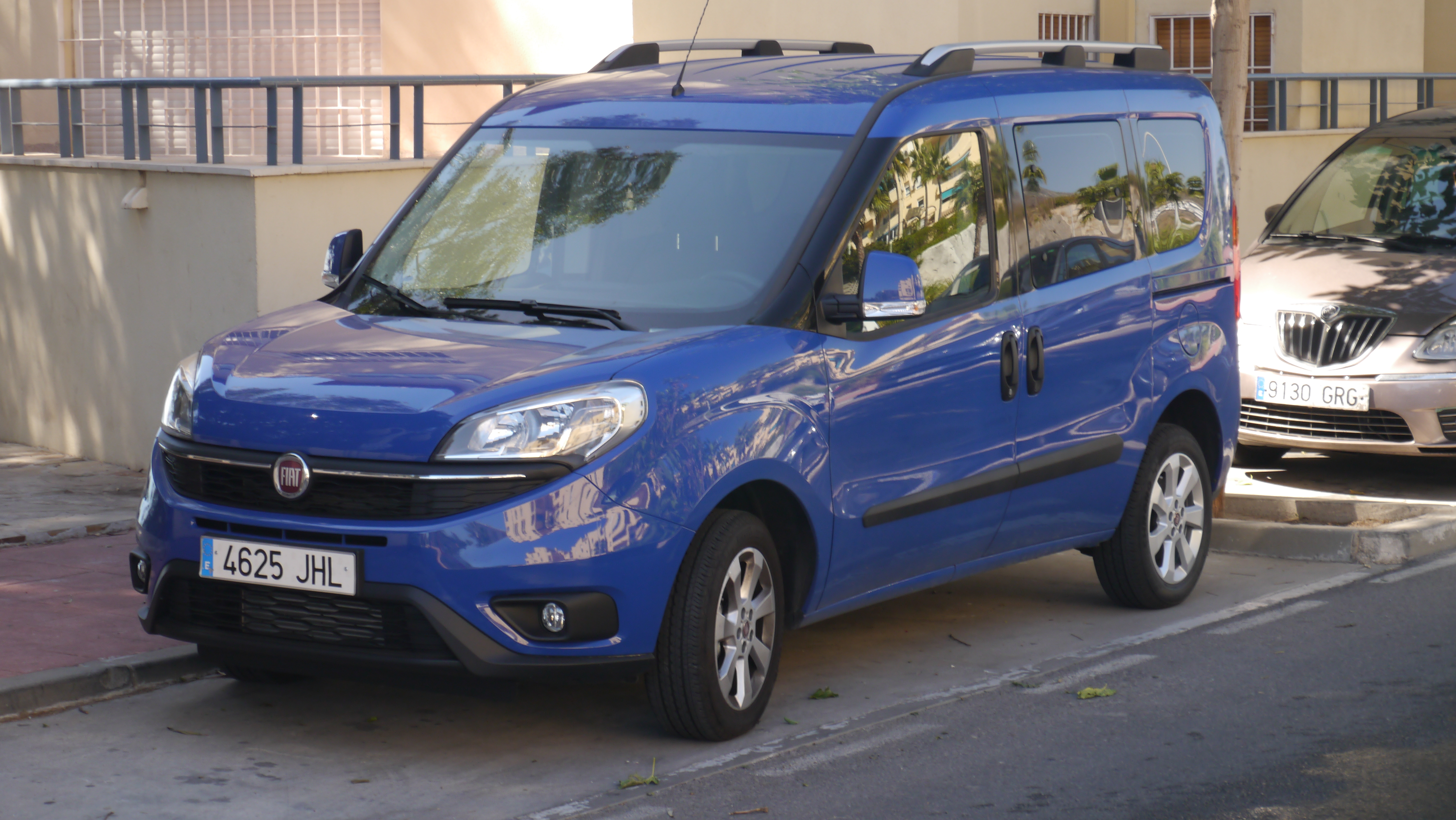

Overview
- Manufacturer: Fiat; Tofaş; Stellantis
- Production: 2000–present

Body and chassis
- Class: Panel van/leisure activity vehicle

Chronology
- Predecessor: Fiat Fiorino; Fiat Marengo; Ram Cargo Van (for Ram ProMaster City)

The Fiat Doblò is a panel van and leisure activity vehicle produced by Italian automaker Fiat since 2000. It was unveiled at the Paris Motor Show in October 2000. A second-generation Doblò succeeded the original vehicle in 2010 for most markets, and it was sold in the United States as the RAM ProMaster City from 2015 to 2022. The second generation was also sold in Europe and the UK as the Opel/Vauxhall Combo. The third-generation Doblò is a rebadged version of the 2018 third-generation Citroën Berlingo, and was unveiled in June 2022. The third generation Doblò is therefore also sold as the Opel or Vauxhall Combo, Peugeot Partner, and Toyota ProAce, as well as the Citroen Berlingo.

== First generation (2000) ==
First generation (223)
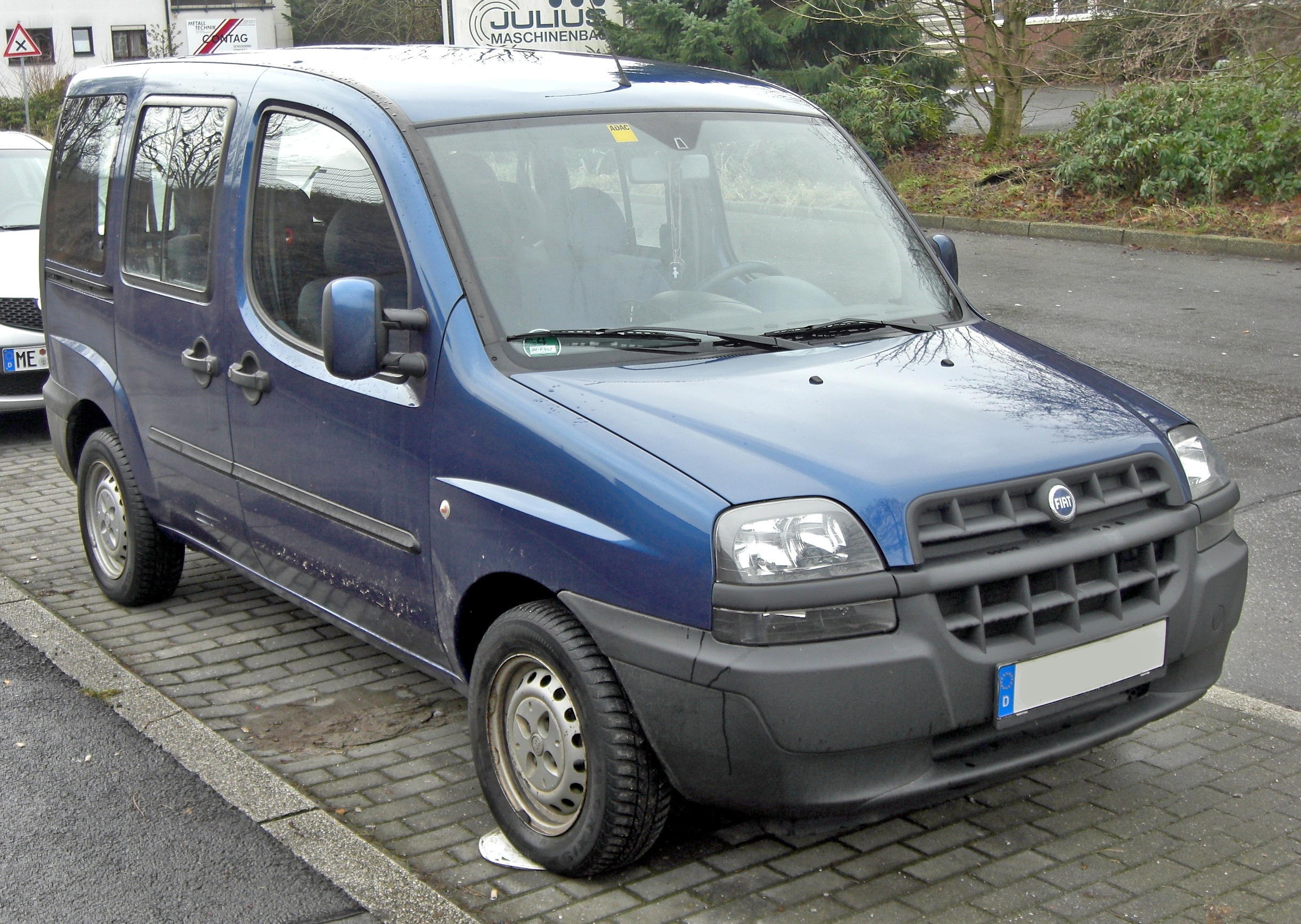

Overview
- Also called: Fiat Panorama (Singapore); Fiat Doblò Classic; Pyeonghwa Ppeokkugi (North Korea)
- Production: June 2000–2010 (Europe); 2001–2021 (Brazil); 2003–2004 (North Korea)
- Assembly: Turkey: Bursa (Tofaş); Turkey: Akçalar (Karsan: body parts); Brazil: Betim, Minas Gerais (Fiat Automóveis); North Korea: Nampo (Pyeonghwa Motors); Russia: Naberezhnye Chelny (Fiat-Sollers); Vietnam: Ho Chi Minh City (Mekong Auto)

Body and chassis
- Body style: 4/5-door panel van 5-door multi-purpose vehicle
- Related: Fiat Punto; Fiat Palio; Fiat Albea; Fiat Siena; Fiat Strada; Lancia Y

Powertrain
- Engine: petrol: 1.2 L Fire I4; 1.4 L Fire I4; 1.6 L Torque I4; 1.8 L Ecotec N18XFH I4; Flexfuel: 1.8 L E.torQ I4; CNG: 1.6 L Torque I4; diesel: 1.3 L Multijet I4; 1.9 L Family B I4; 1.9 L Family B JTD/Multijet I4
- Transmission: 5-speed manual 6-speed manual

Dimensions
- Wheelbase: 2,583 mm (101.7 in); 2,963 mm (116.7 in) (Doblò Maxi)
- Length: 4,158 mm (163.7 in) (until 2005); 4,253 mm (167.4 in) (from 2005); 4,633 mm (182.4 in) (Doblò Maxi); 4,354 mm (171.4 in) (Adventure)
- Width: from 1,715 mm (67.5 in) (until 2005); 1,722 mm (67.8 in) (from 2005); 1,763 mm (69.4 in) (Adventure)
- Height: 1,818 mm (71.6 in) (from 2005); 2,086 mm (82.1 in) (high roof); 1,957 mm (77.0 in) (Adventure)

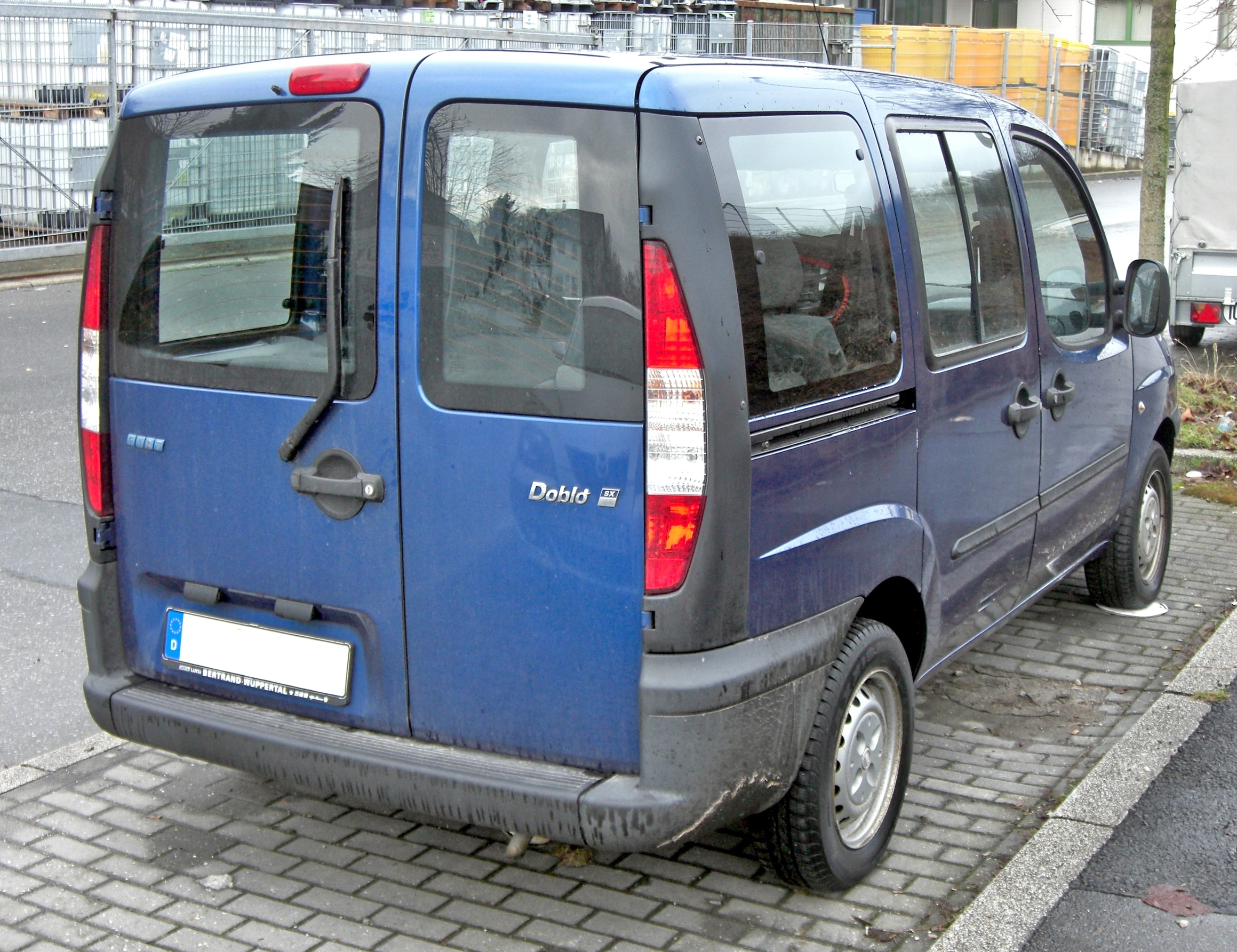
Pre facelift Fiat Doblò

It was first launched to the public in the Netherlands, and received the "2006 International Van of the Year" award by an international jury from 19 countries. In Singapore, a 1.4 litre LAV variant is marketed as the Fiat Panorama in five and seven seater versions. The first Doblò was sold in January 2001.

The Doblò carries a payload of up to 730 kg (1,609 lb), with an interior volume of 3.2 cubic metres (110 cu ft). The Doblò uses Fiat Strada's platform, in turn derived from the Fiat Palio's one, using a rigid axle with leaf springs at the rear, instead of a torsion beam with coil springs as on the Palio.

It is manufactured by Fiat's Tofaş subsidiary factory in Bursa, Turkey, in Brazil since 2002 and in Russia and Vietnam. Turkish models have an engine range that includes a 1.4 litre petrol, a 1.9 litre MultiJet, and a 16 valve 1.3 litre MultiJet.

In North Korea, Pyonghwa Motors produced Doblò branded Pyeonghwa Ppeokkugi ("Cuckoo") beginning in mid-2003. The car was not successful and production was halted in 2004.

Facelifted Doblò (223; 2005–2010)
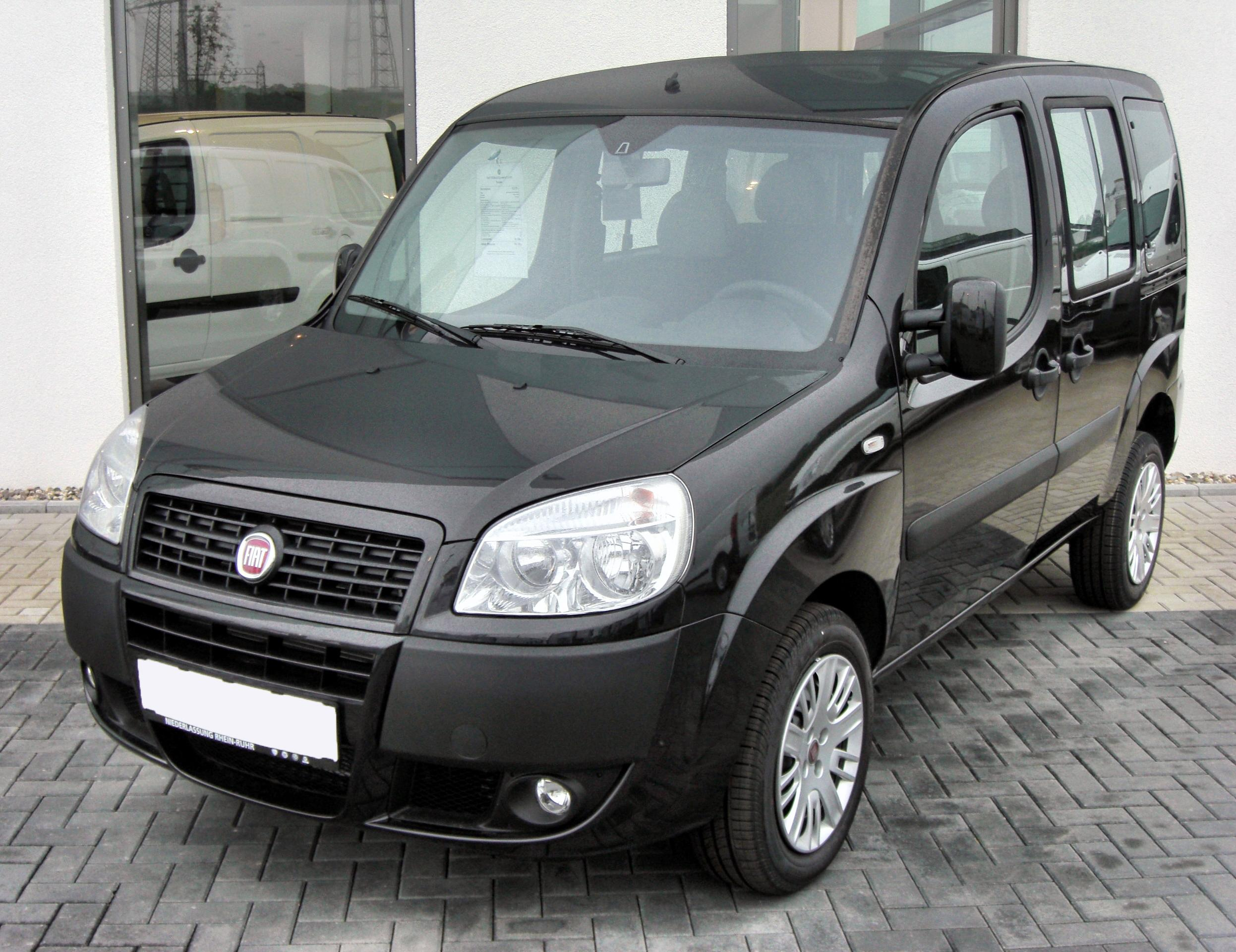

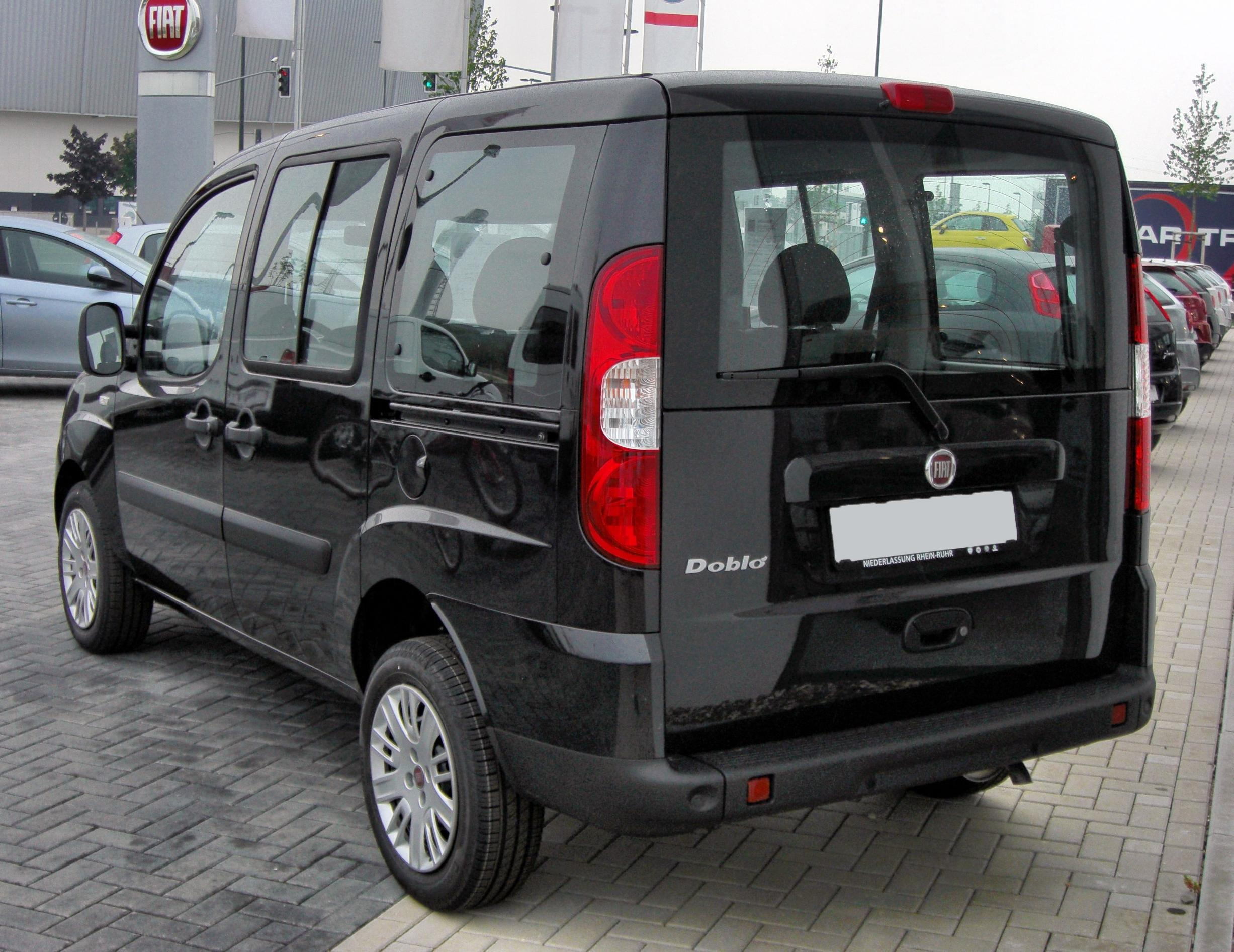
Short wheelbase

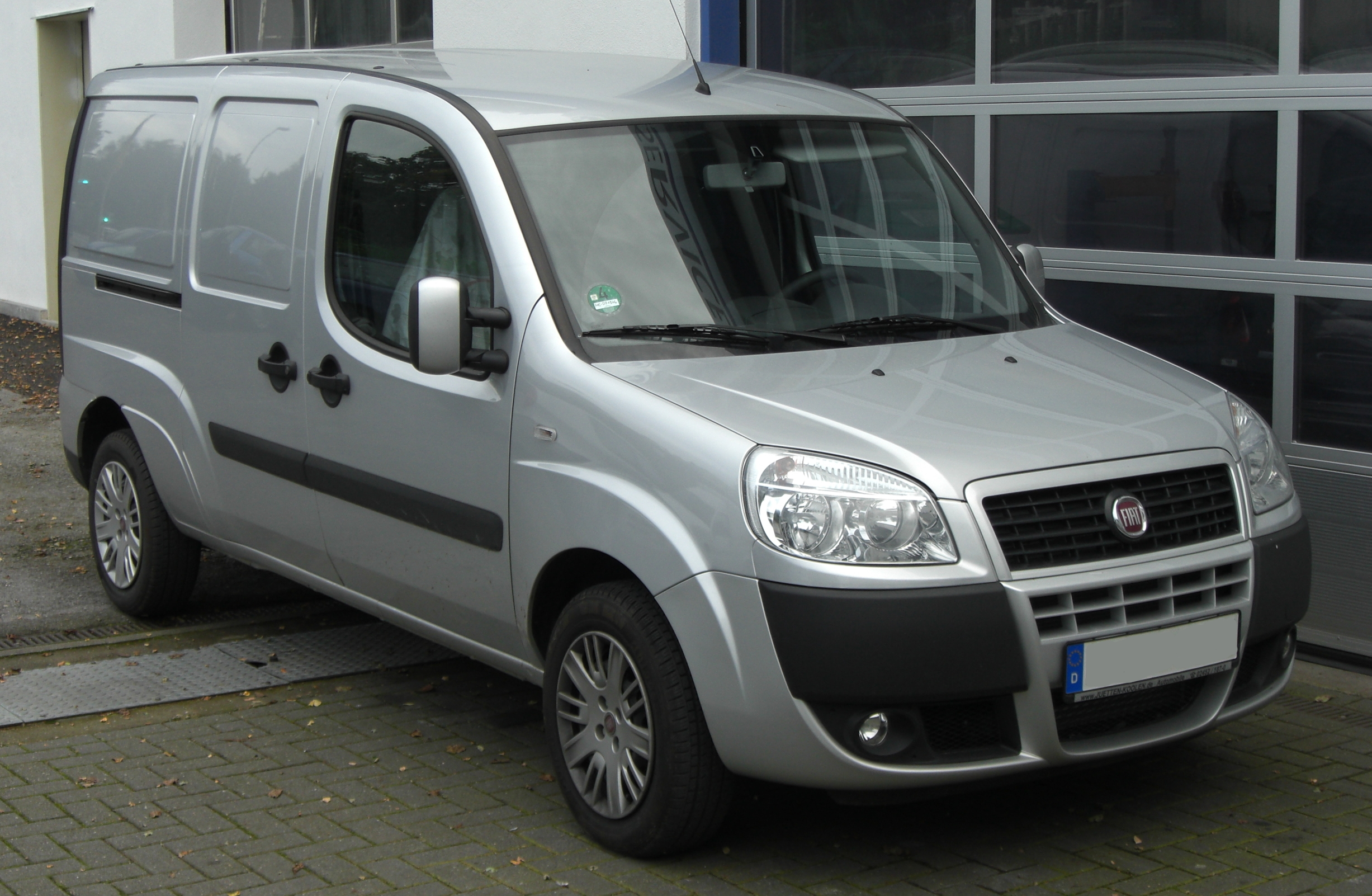

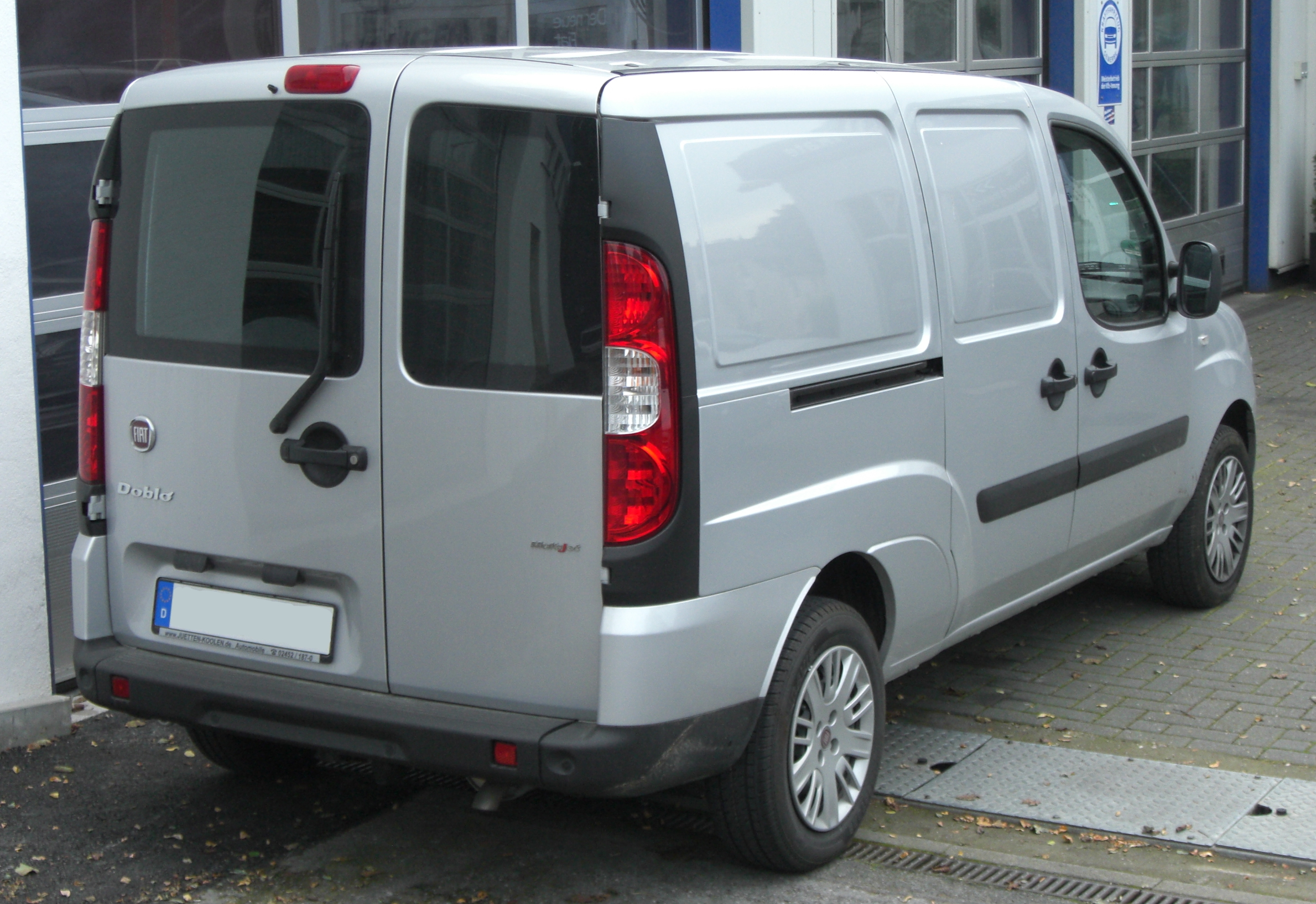
Long wheelbase (Cargo XXL)

The facelift version came in October 2005, and was restyled with modifications to the front and rear light groups, and the total design of the front part.

=== Brazilian Doblò ===
Launched in late 2001 as a 2002 model, the Brazilian Doblòs were initially available with two 16 valve petrol engines, a 1.3 litre Fire and a 1.6 litre Torque. From 2004 to 2009, the only engine available in Brazil was an 8 valve 1.8 litre Ecotec, supplied by General Motors do Brasil. This engine was produced initially in a petrol version, and later as flex fuel.

In September 2003, Fiat Brazil introduced an off-road oriented, two-wheel drive version called Fiat Doblò Adventure, also with the 1.8-litre Ecotec straight-four engine. It has revised exterior look with bigger bumpers and mouldings, ride height raised by 6 cm (2.4 in), and spare wheel mounted on the rear.

In 2009, the whole Adventure line (Doblò, Idea, Strada and Palio Weekend) was equipped with a locking differential. The line was rebadged as Adventure Locker. Only in the model year of 2010, the Brazilian Doblò and the Doblò Adventure were updated with the European facelift of 2005.

Besides the 1.8 litre Powertrain, Doblò is now equipped with a 1.4 litre Fire flex engine. In the model year of 2011, the 8 valve 1.8 litre Ecotec engine was replaced by the brand new 16 valve 1.8 litre E.torQ engine, produced by Fiat Powertrain Technologies.

The Brazilian Doblò was discontinued in December 2021 after 160,000 units had been assembled in 20 years. Slow sales meant that meeting the upcoming Proconve L7 emissions standards would not be viable.

=== Engines ===
==== 2000–2006 ====
Model	Type	Power
1.2	petrol	65 PS (48 kW; 64 hp)
1.6	petrol	103 PS (76 kW; 102 hp)
1.3 16V Multijet	diesel	70 PS (51.5 kW; 69 hp)
1.6 Natural Power	natural gas	92 PS (68 kW; 91 hp)
1.9 D	diesel	63 PS (46 kW; 62 hp)
1.9 JTD	diesel	105 PS (77 kW; 104 hp)

==== 2006–2009 ====
Model	Type	Power
1.4	petrol	77 PS (57 kW; 76 hp)
1.6 Natural Power (CNG)	Natural gas	92 PS (68 kW; 91 hp)
1.3 16v Multijet	diesel	75 PS (55 kW; 74 hp)
1.3 16v Multijet	diesel	84 PS (62 kW; 83 hp)
1.9 Multijet	diesel	105 PS (77 kW; 104 hp)
1.9 Multijet	diesel	120 PS (88 kW; 118 hp)

=== Electric versions ===
Micro-Vett Fiat Doblò has three battery versions:

- Go Green, an 18 kWh Altairnano lithium-ion NanoSafe battery pack. The battery pack can be fully recharged in less than ten minutes using AeroVironment's high voltage, 125 kW rated, rapid charging system.
- a 43 kWh lead acid battery pack, providing a range of 150 km (93 mi) in the urban duty cycle on a single charge; recharging takes 5–8 hours
- 60 x 200 AH 3.6V lithium modules; Battery life: 1000 cycles at 80% DOD / 2000 cycles at 70% DOD

The vehicle uses a 30 kW (60 kW peak) motor from Ansaldo Electric Drives (a S.p.A. based in Genoa), that gives 120 km/h (75 mph) top speed.

On October 2, 2007, a 60-day demonstration of the All-Electric Fiat Doblo was begun. The electric engine, powered by a custom 18 kWh Altairnano high performance NanoSafe(R) battery pack, travelled 300 kilometres (190 mi) in an urban delivery circuit.

The custom battery pack was fully recharged in less than ten minutes a total of three times using AeroVironment's high voltage, 125 kW rated, rapid charging system. The vehicle was driven an estimated total of 7,500 kilometres (4,700 mi) during the sixty day demonstration period, which translates to an annual equivalent use of 45,000 kilometres (28,000 mi).

=== Safety ===
The Doblò received 3 stars for adult occupants, 3 stars for toddlers, and 1 star for pedestrians from Euro NCAP in 2004.

== Second generation (2010) ==
Second generation (263)
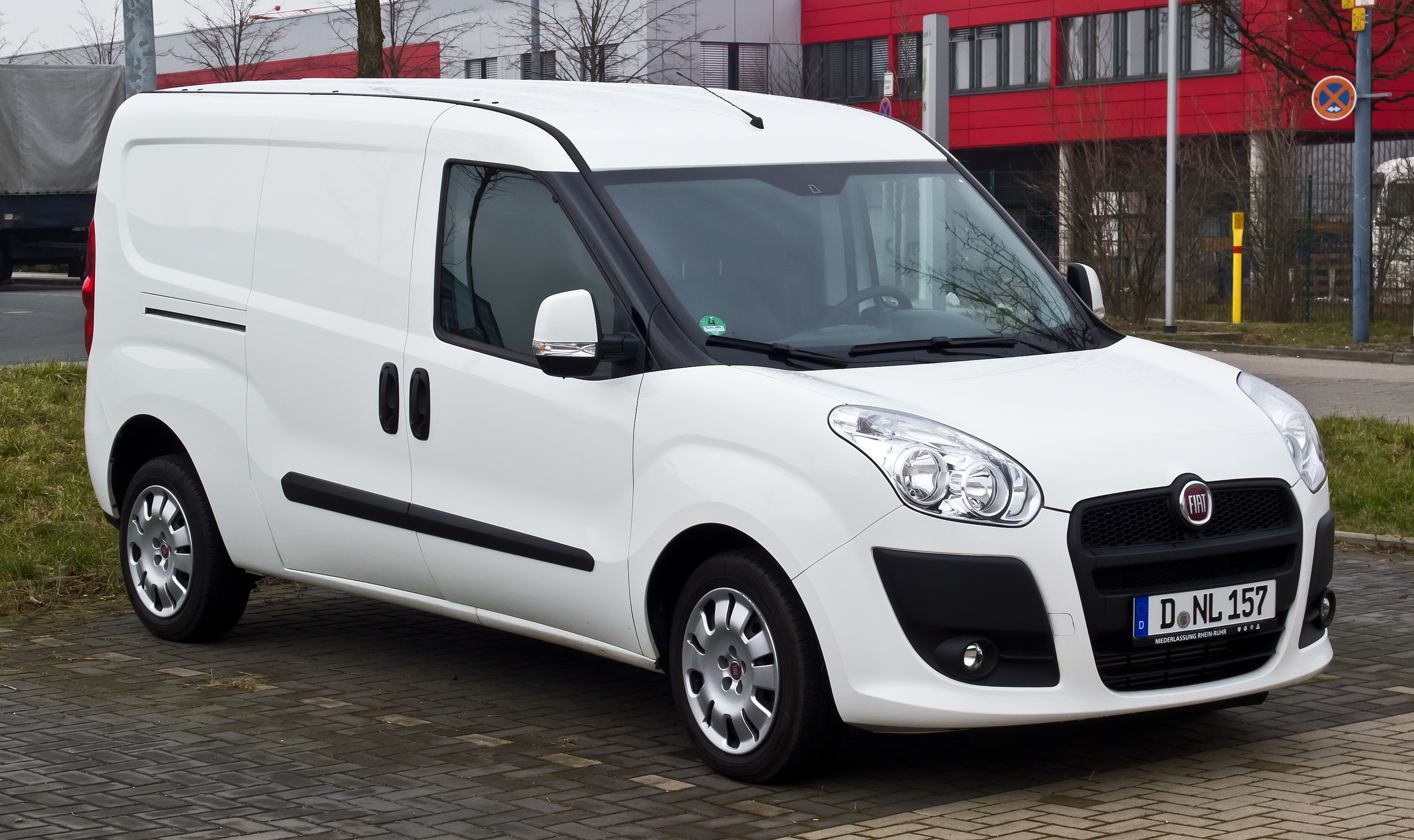

Overview
- Also called: Opel Combo (2012–2018); Fiat Doblò Professional; Fiat Doblò Work Up; Fiat Doblò Maxi; Fiat Doblò Maxi Professional; Fiat Pratico (Turkey); Fiat Doblò Panorama; Fiat Doblò Premio (Turkey); Fiat Doblò Premio Plus (Turkey); Vauxhall Combo (United Kingdom); Ram ProMaster City (North America); Ram V1000 (Chile)
- Production: December 2009–2022; 2015–2022 (North America)
- Assembly: Turkey: Bursa (Tofaş)

Body and chassis
- Body style: 2-door chassis cab 2-door pickup 3-door panel van 4-door panel van 5-door panel van 5-door LAV
- Platform: FCA Small LWB platform
- Related: Fiat Grande Punto; Fiat Linea; Opel Corsa D

Powertrain
- Engine: petrol: 1.4 L Fire I4; 2.4 L Tigershark I4; CNG: 1.4 L Fire turbo I4; diesel: 1.3 L Multijet I4; 1.6 L Multijet I4; 2.0 L Multijet I4
- Transmission: 5/6-speed manual; 5-speed Dualogic automated manual; 9-speed 948TE automatic

Dimensions
- Wheelbase: SWB: 2,755 mm (108.5 in); LWB: 3,105 mm (122.2 in)
- Length: SWB: 4,390 mm (172.8 in); LWB: 4,756 mm (187.2 in)
- Width: SWB: 1,832 mm (72.1 in); LWB: 1,832 mm (72.1 in)
- Height: SWB: 1,845 mm (72.6 in); LWB: 1,880 mm (74.0 in)

Chronology
- Predecessor: Ram C/V Tradesman (for ProMaster City)

Doblò (263), 2010–15

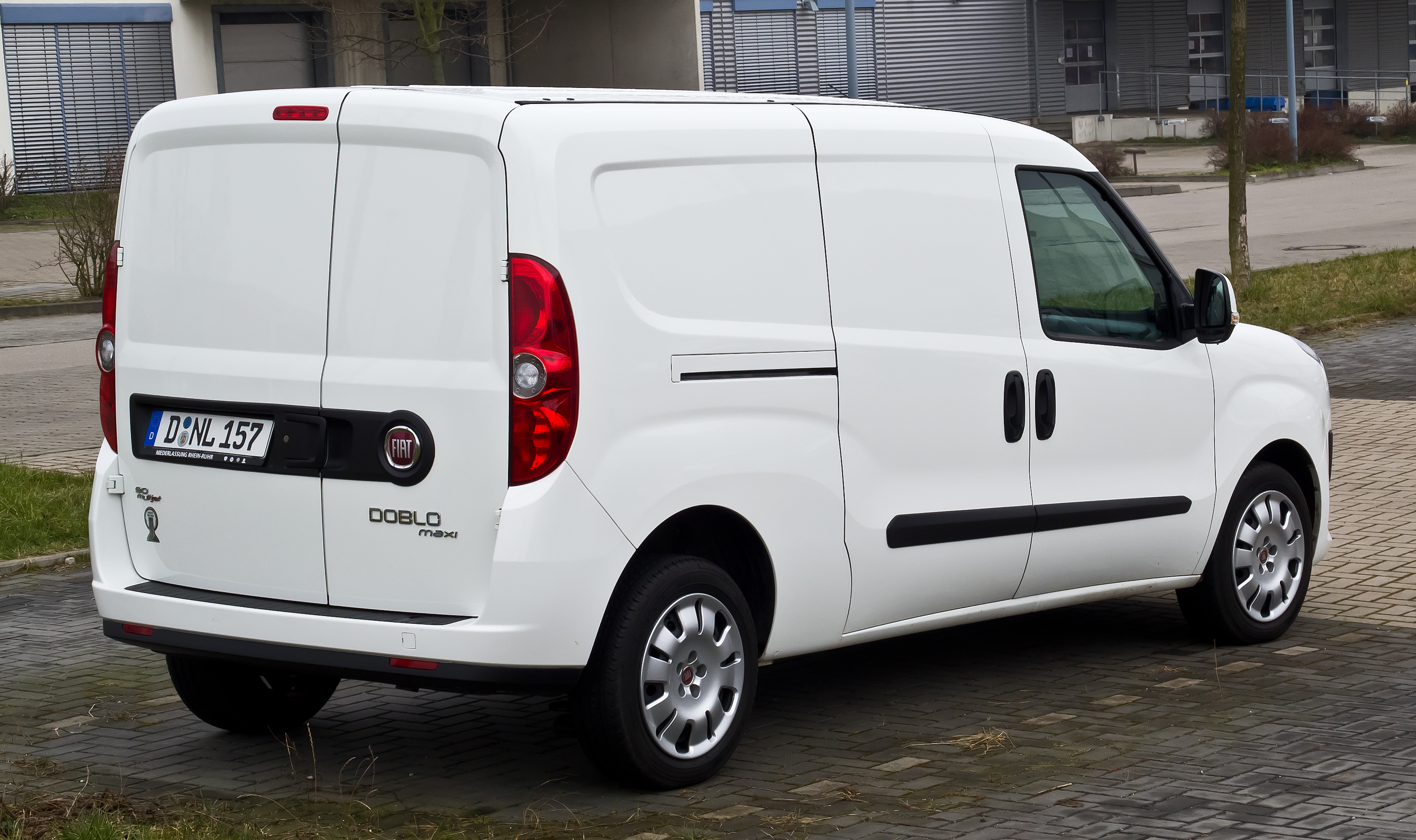
Cargo Maxi (Rear)

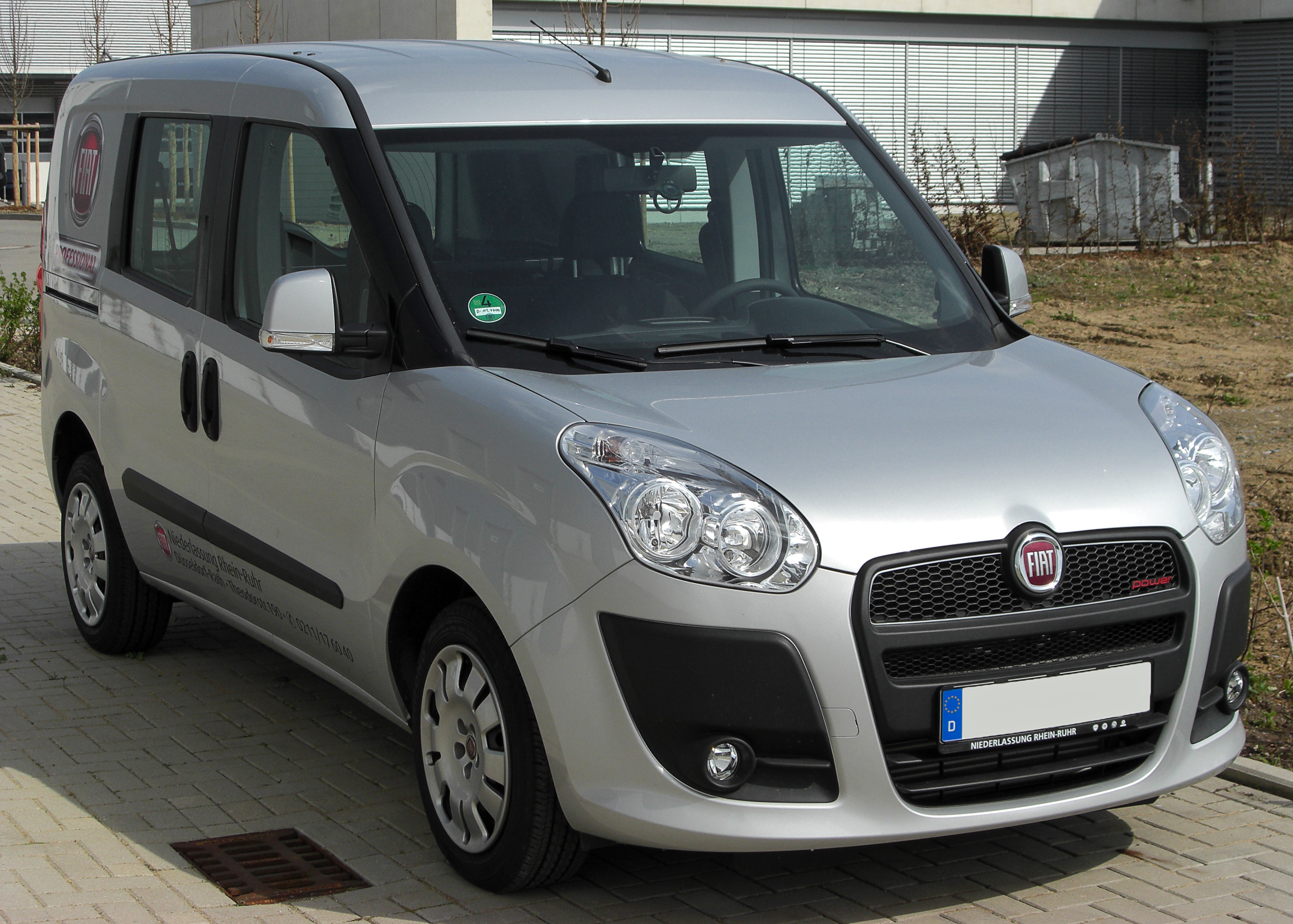

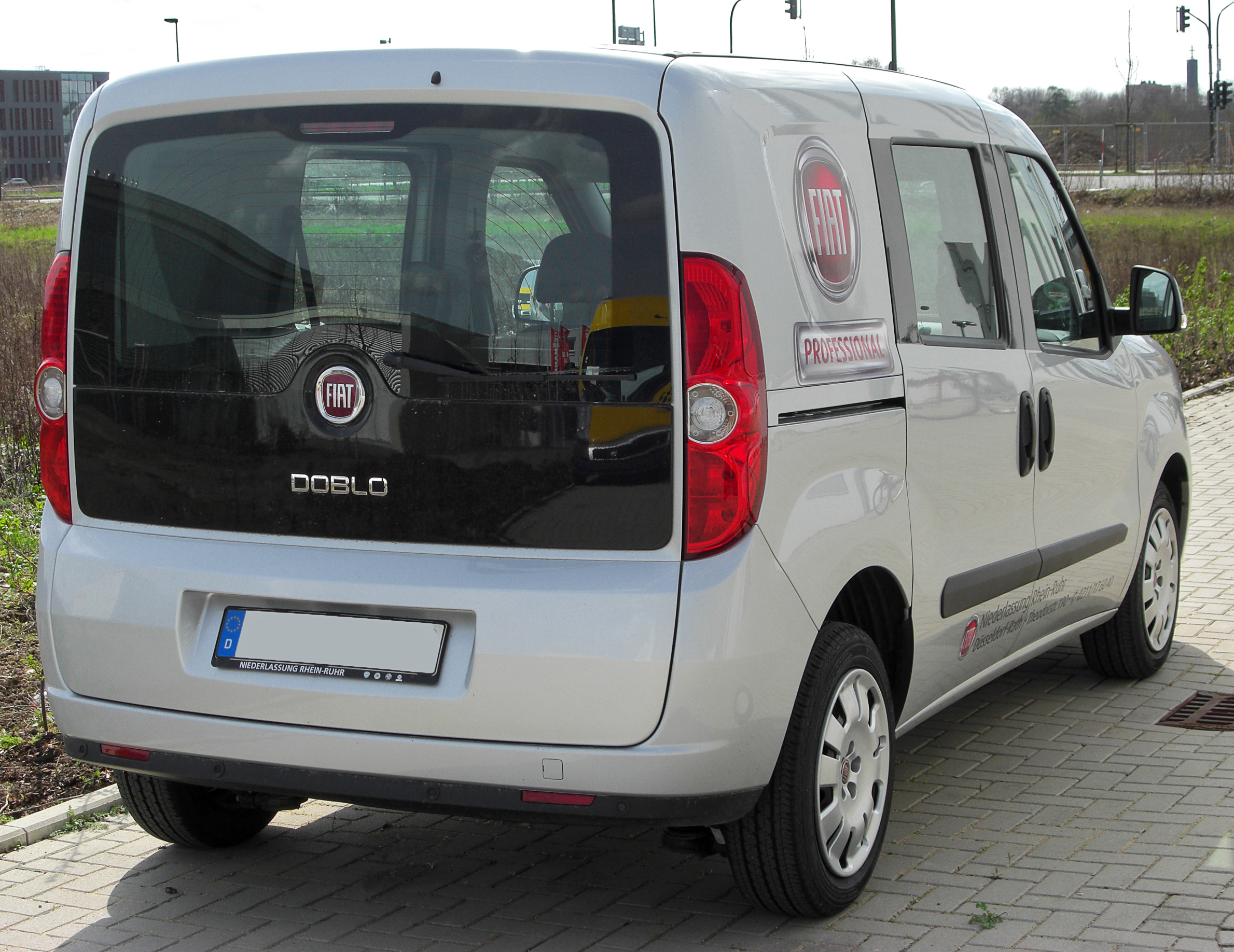
Fiat Doblò (Europe)

The all new Doblò (Type 263) was launched in the beginning of 2010, and it is built in Turkey by Tofaş. The 2010 Doblò uses the Fiat Small platform, derived from the Grande Punto, with a new bi link independent rear suspension instead of a torsion beam, with a 790-litre (28 cu ft) luggage compartment, and low CO_{2} emissions (129 g/km with the 1.3 Multijet, 90 PS (66 kW; 89 hp) engine). The Doblò was also sold by Opel and Vauxhall except for Holden as the Combo.

As of July 2011 the Doblò is available as a pickup called Fiat Doblò Work Up or Fiat Pratico in Turkey. There is also a raised roof version, as well as an extended wheelbase van called the "Doblò Cargo Maxi". During the 2010 Hanover Motor Show, the Fiat Doblò received the International Van of the Year 2011 award.

These two features are combined for the Fiat Doblò Cargo XL, a high roofed, long wheelbase panel van model, with a one tonne payload, equipped with the 105 hp (78 kW) 1.6 litre Multijet common rail diesel. The XL, which can carry as much as the bigger and more expensive Scudo, was presented in the United Kingdom in May 2013.

In other markets the XL appeared in 2012, and it is available with all diesel engines excepting the 1.3, and also the 1.4 T-Jet. There is also an XL Combi, with a 135 PS (99 kW) version of the 2.0 diesel.

=== Doblò EV ===
In February 2010, Tofaş announced they were developing a battery-electric version of the Doblò (263). The vehicle itself was introduced publicly in July 2010, as "The First Commercial Electrical Vehicle Developed in Turkey". It also was revealed that Tofaş will lead FIAT's development of electric light commercial vehicles (LCV). During a ceremony to commemorate the production of the millionth Doblò, the Doblò EV was tested by press and Turkish Minister of Industry and Commerce, Nihat Ergün. In November 2018, the first Doblò EV was delivered to the Turkish fashion company, Vakko.

As announced in 2010, the Doblò EV was equipped with a 250 kg (551 lb), 21 kW-hr lithium-ion battery and a 140 PS (103 kW) traction motor; as charge depletes, the motor output is limited to 79 PS (58 kW) and top speed is limited to 110 km/h (68 mph) to preserve the 150 km (93 mi) range. A version of Doblò EV that was shipped in 2019 has an electric motor delivering 111 PS (82 kW) of maximum power and torque of 220 N⋅m (162 lb⋅ft). The autonomy at full load is 210 km (130 mi) with a single recharge. The 30 kWh battery is located in the rear floor. Overall the Doblò EV weighs 150 kg (331 lb) more than the Cargo 1.6 Multijet version.

=== Facelift ===
Facelifted Doblò (263), 2015–22

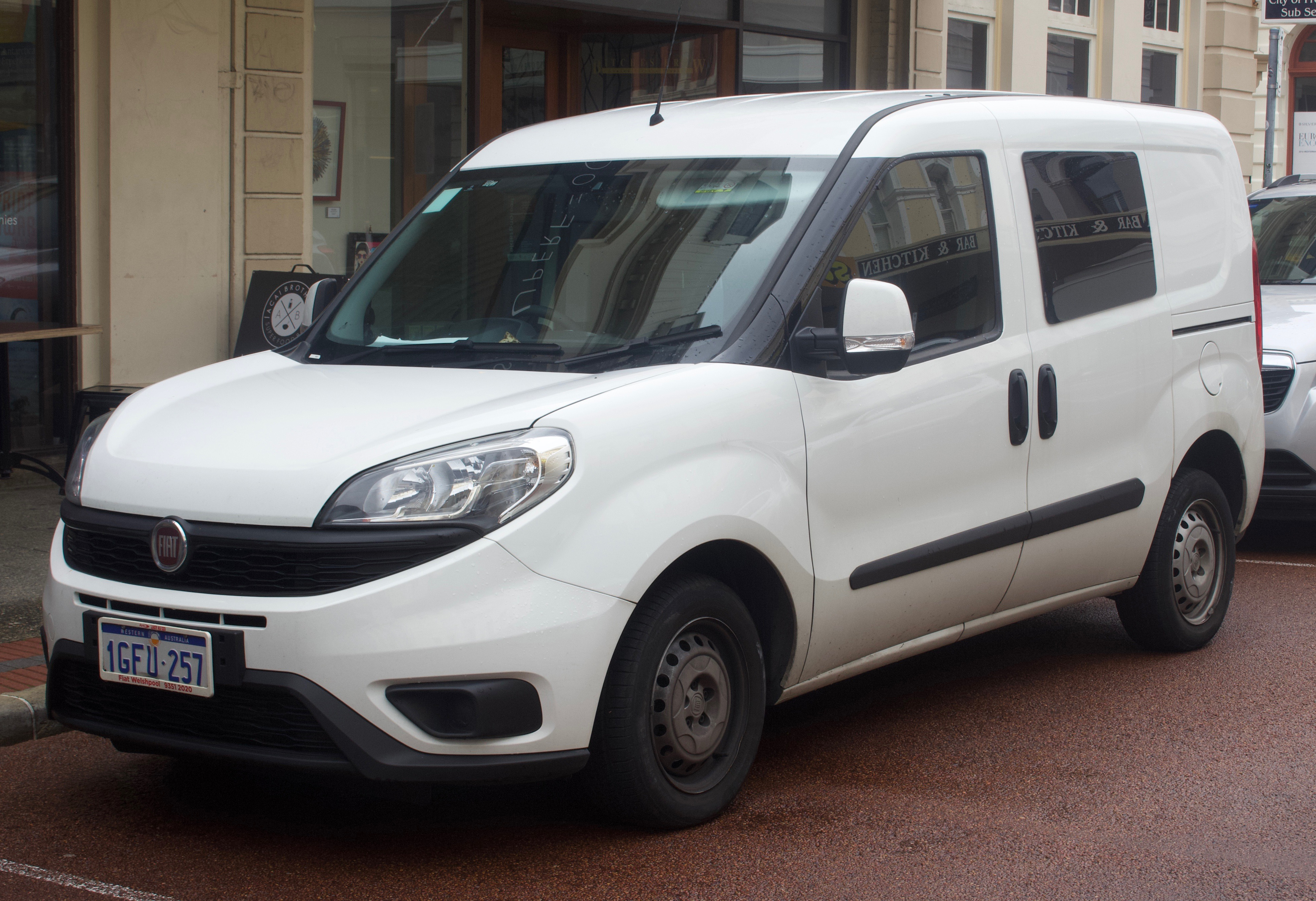
Front

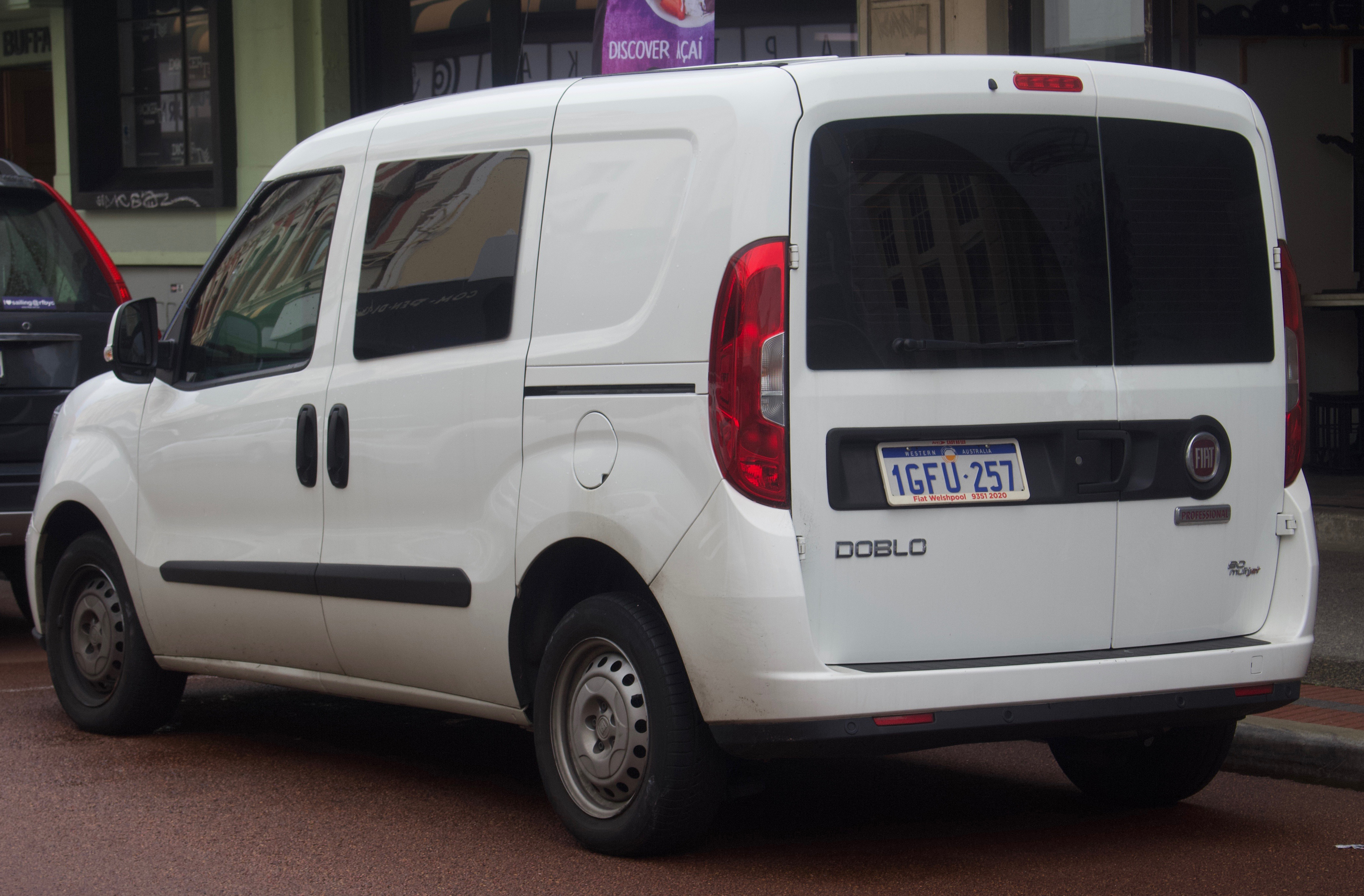
Rear

Introduced at the Hanover Motor Show, the 2015 Fiat Doblò receives a revised front end with an all new dashboard, new headlamps, grille, and front bumper to coincide with the release of the Ram ProMaster City.

Versions include standard, Active, SX and Technico for the commercial versions and Pop, Easy, Lounge and Trekking for the passenger (MPV) models. When the Doblo was crash tested by NCAP in 2017 it received a safety rating of 3 out of 5 stars.

For the 2019 model year the Doblò MPV is no longer available for the UK market. The N1 Fiat professional commercial version remains on sale although the 1.4-litre petrol engine has been discontinued, with only 1.3 and 1.6 Diesel options available for the UK. This model can be specified as a passenger variant with factory windows and seats and either a rear tailgate or the van style double rear doors.

In 2020 the MPV version of the Fiat Doblò ceased production for most markets. As of 2022, the Doblò MPV remains on sale in some markets, including the Turkish and Russian markets, as the Doblò Panorama. The Doblò Cargo van also remains in production - albeit with more limited engine options than previously.

In September 2022, the second generation Dobló was discontinued in Europe and it was replaced by the third generation, which is a rebadged version of a third generation Citroën Berlingo.

Late 2022, the second generation Dobló stopped to be exported, but it remained in production for 2023 in Turkey.

=== Ram ProMaster City ===
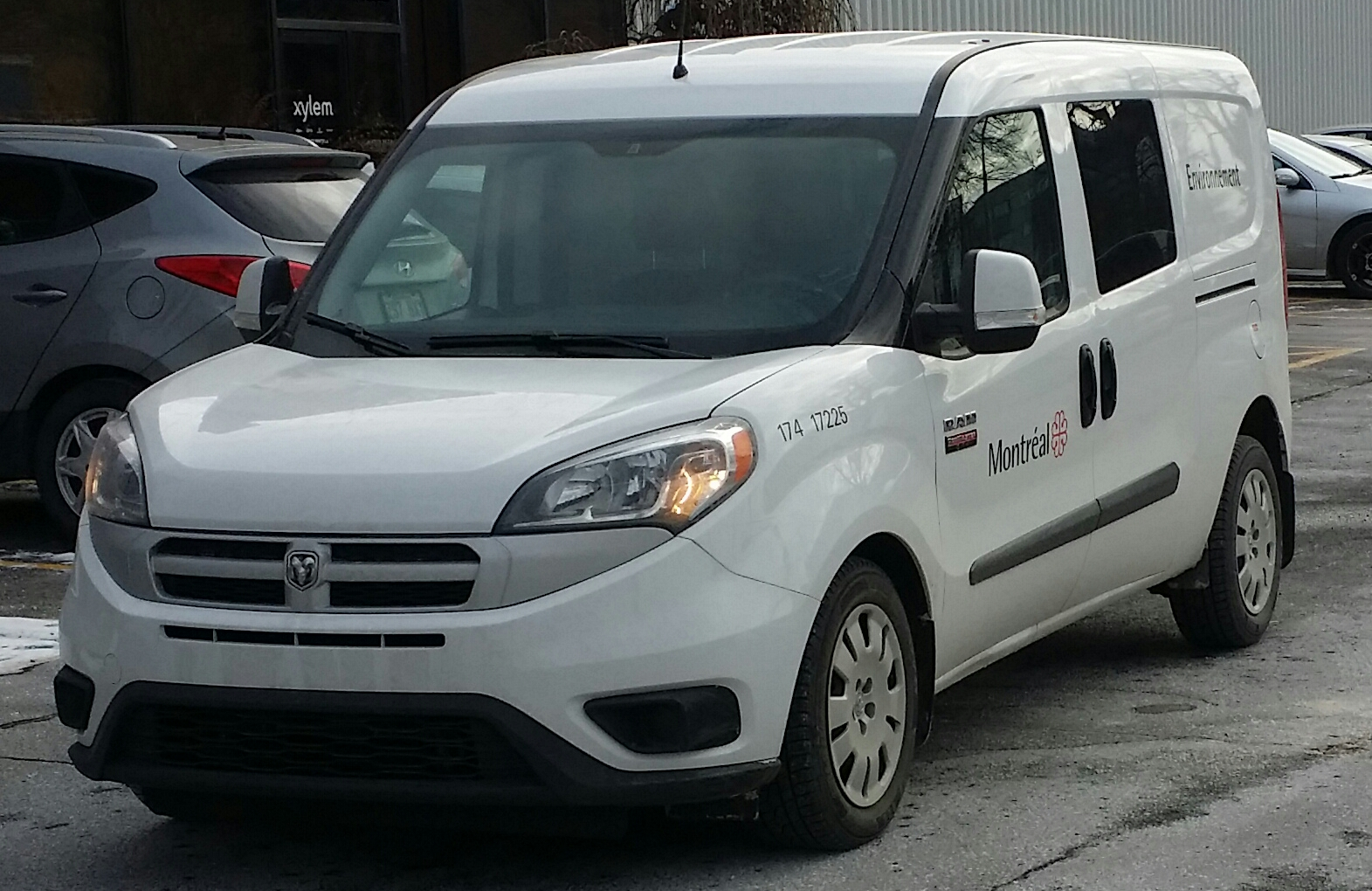
A 2015 Ram ProMaster City Tradesman Passenger Van (USA & Canada)

The Ram ProMaster City (Type 636) is an Americanised version of the Fiat Doblò introduced in the model year of 2015, to succeed the Dodge Caravan based C/V Tradesman. The ProMaster City is built in the same plant in Turkey as the Doblò and exported to North America. To circumvent the chicken tax, only passenger vans are imported into North America, with cargo vans being post import conversions.

Unlike the Doblò, passenger versions of the ProMaster City use solid metal panels instead of glass in its rear quarters, and third row seating and the lift tailgate options are not offered. The 2.4-litre Tigershark engine mated to the 948TE nine-speed automatic transmission is the only power train available for the ProMaster City.

Trim levels are Tradesman, SLT, Wagon, and Wagon SLT. Like the larger Ram ProMaster, the Ram ProMaster City received a facelift for the model year of 2019. The front "crosshair" grille was replaced with a plain front grille with the 'RAM' lettering.

The interior of the facelifted 2019 Ram ProMaster City remains largely unchanged from 2018, although the U Connect 3 5.0BT touchscreen radio is now standard equipment (both GPS navigation and SiriusXM Satellite Radio still remain options), replacing the previously standard U Connect 3.0 non touchscreen radio on models from 2018. This is due to the National Highway Traffic Safety Administration (NHTSA) regulation of standard rear view backup cameras for the model year of 2019. Now standard are a USB input as well as U Connect Bluetooth hands free calling and wireless A2DP audio streaming, as well as voice control.

Stellantis discontinued the original ProMaster City after the 2022 model year, citing declining annual sales for compact commercial vans in the US and Canadian markets. Shipments of the van from Turkey to the United States and Canada were set to continue until the end of the first quarter of 2023.

The ProMaster City is expected to return to North America in 2027 as a larger, mid-sized van, based on the Citroën Jumpy and its sibling models.

=== Engines ===
Model	Engine	Power@rpm	Torque@rpm	Note
Petrol engine
1.4 FIRE	1368 cc I4	95 PS (70 kW; 94 hp)@6000	127 N⋅m (94 lb⋅ft)@4500	2009-2019
2.4 Tigershark^{1}	2360 cc I4	179 PS (132 kW; 177 hp)@6250	236 N⋅m (174 lb⋅ft)@3900	2015-on
Compressed natural gas
1.4 T-JET Natural Power	1368 cc I4	120 PS (88 kW; 118 hp)@5000	207 N⋅m (153 lb⋅ft)@2000	2009-on
Diesel engine
1.3 Multijet	1248 cc I4	90 PS (66 kW; 89 hp)@4000	200 N⋅m (148 lb⋅ft)@1500	2009-on
1.6 Multijet	1598 cc I4	105 PS (77 kW; 104 hp) @4000 rpm	290 N⋅m (214 lb⋅ft) @1500	2009-on
2.0 Multijet	1956 cc I4	135 PS (99 kW; 133 hp) @3500 rpm	320 N⋅m (236 lb⋅ft) @1500	2009-2016

^{1} Only for Ram ProMaster City

=== Safety ===
The Doblò received 3 stars from Euro NCAP in 2017.

== Third generation (K9; 2022) ==
Third generation
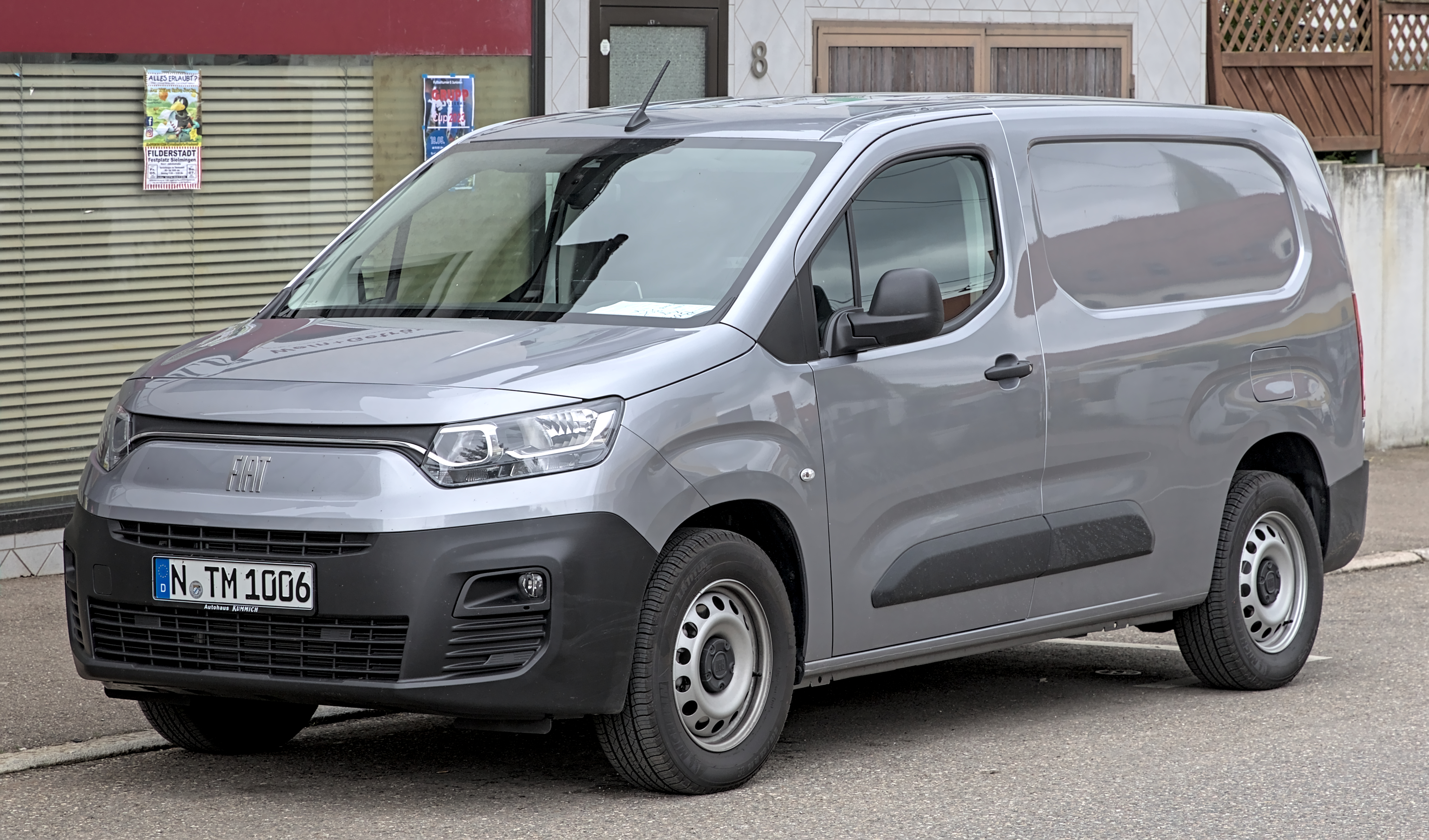

Overview
- Also called: Fiat Doblò Panorama; Fiat Qubo L; Citroën Berlingo; Opel Combo; Peugeot Partner / Rifter; Toyota ProAce City (2019–present); Vauxhall Combo (United Kingdom)
- Production: 2023–present
- Assembly: Spain: Vigo (PSA Vigo Plant); Portugal: Mangualde (PSA Mangualde Plant); United Kingdom: Ellesmere Port (Vauxhall Ellesmere Port); Algeria: Tafraoui (Stellantis Algeria)

Body and chassis
- Body style: 4/5-door panel van 5-door LAV
- Platform: PSA EMP2

Powertrain
- Engine: petrol: 1.2 L EB2 Puretech turbo I3; 1.6 L EC5 I4; diesel: 1.5 L DV5 BlueHDi I4; 1.6 L DV6 D HDi / BlueHDi I4
- Electric motor: 136 PS (100 kW; 134 hp) PMSM (electric versions)
- Transmission: 5-6-speed manual 8-speed automatic EAT8
- Battery: 50 kWh lithium-ion (electric versions)

Dimensions
- Wheelbase: 2,785–2,975 mm (109.6–117.1 in)
- Length: 4,403–4,753 mm (173.3–187.1 in)
- Width: 1,921 mm (75.6 in)
- Height: 1,796–1,860 mm (70.7–73.2 in)
- Curb weight: 1,430–1,664 kg (3,153–3,668 lb)

Chronology
- Predecessor: Fiat Fiorino/Citroën Nemo/Peugeot Bipper

The third-generation Doblò was released in June 2022 as a rebadged version of the third-generation Citroën Berlingo, with a battery electric version in offer as the e-Doblò. The model is produced in Spain alongside its stablemates, as well as in the Stellantis Mangualde Plant in Mangualde, Portugal, and in the Ellesmere Port plant in Ellesmere Port, England, and at the Stellantis Tafraoui plant in Oran, Algeria.

=== Gallery ===
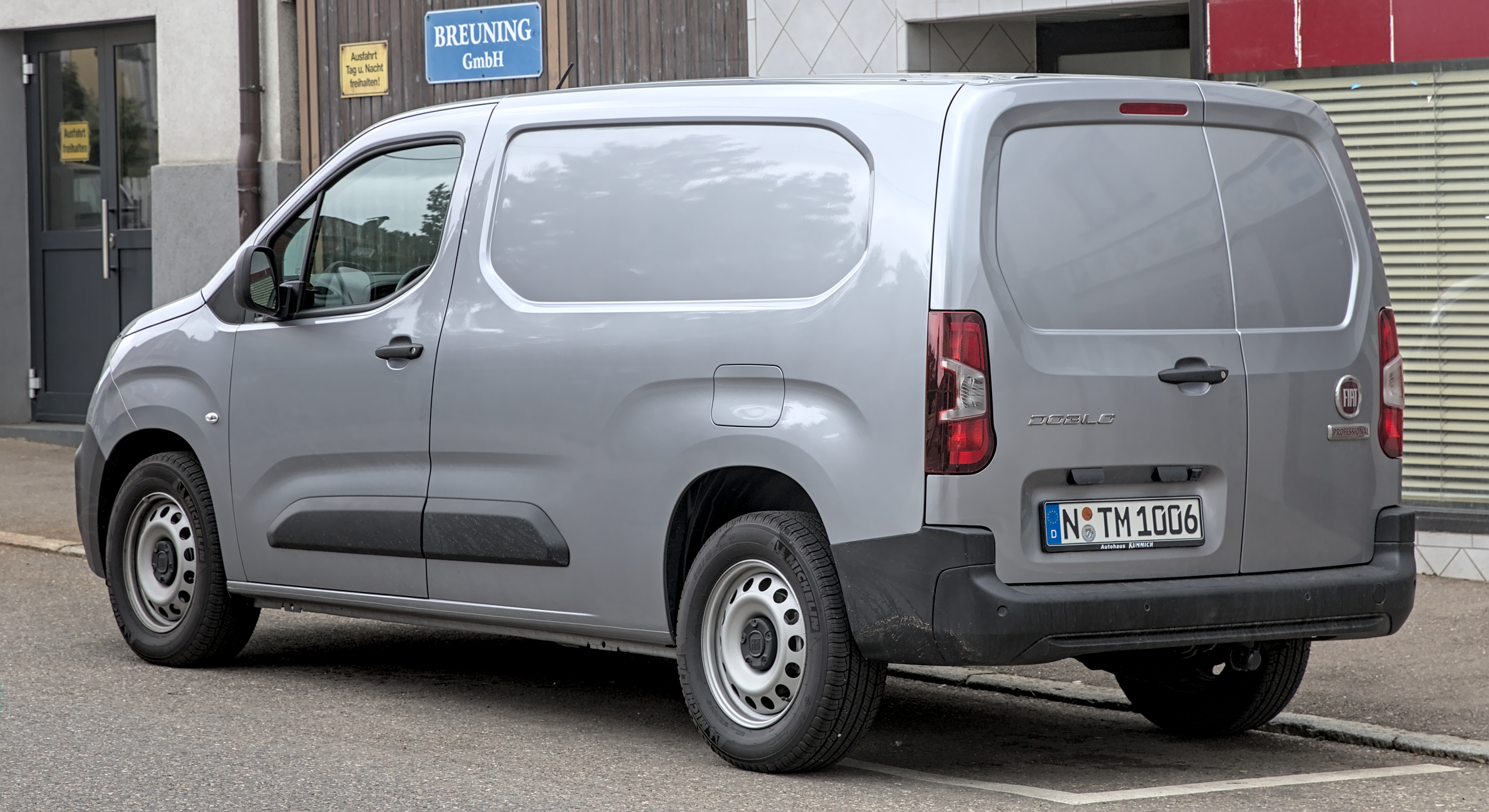
Rear view

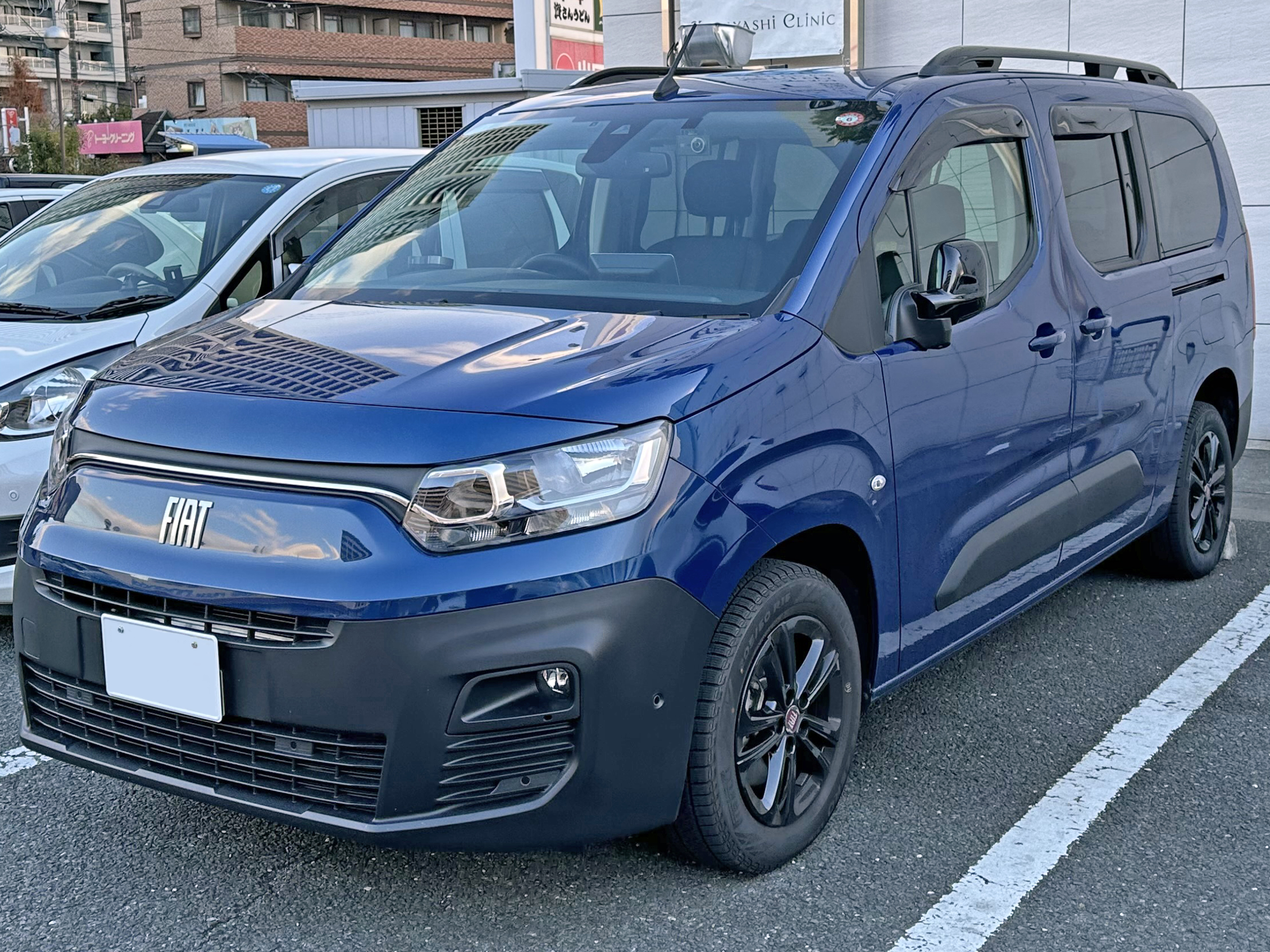
Fiat Doblò Maxi

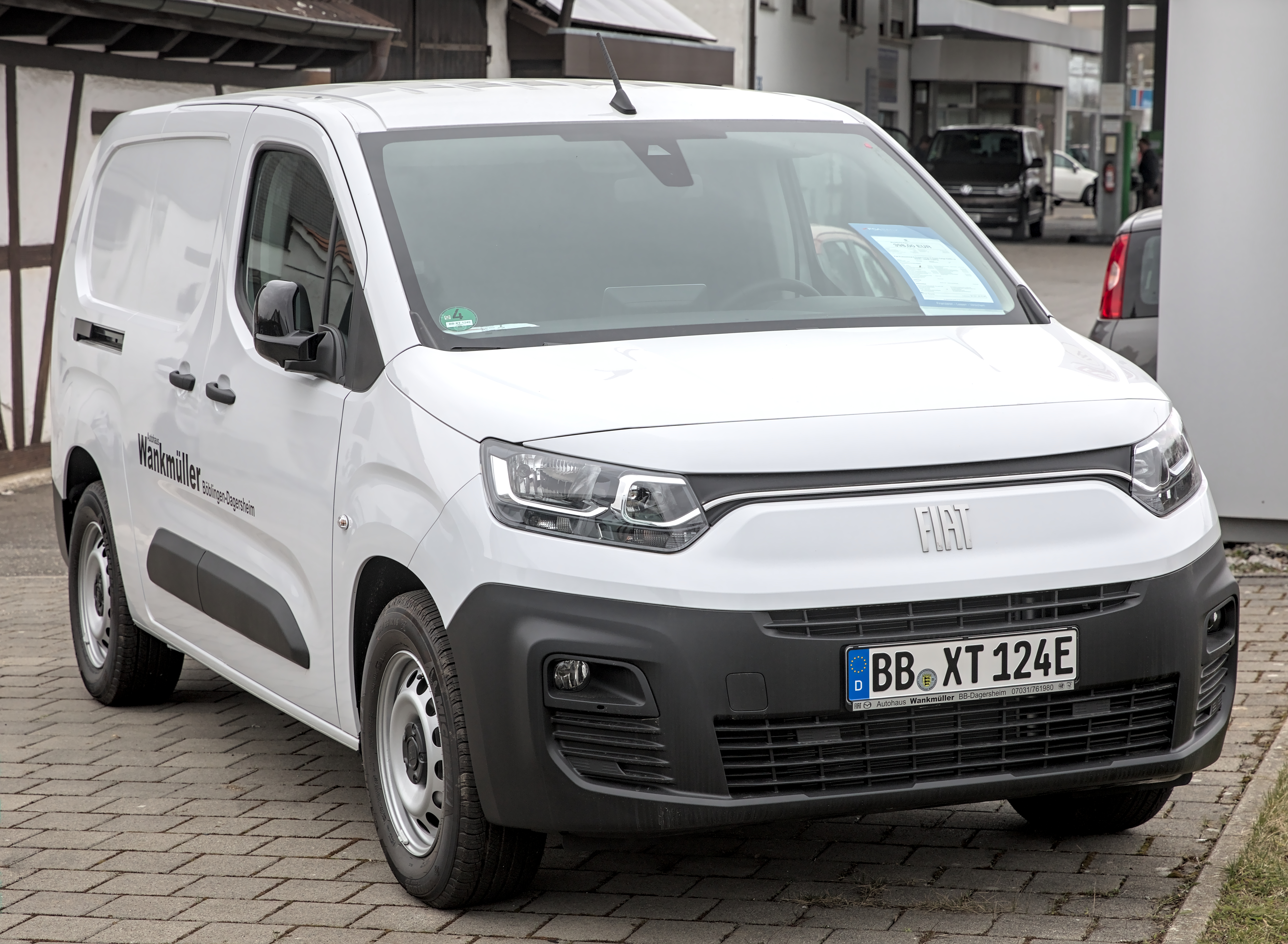
Fiat E-Doblò

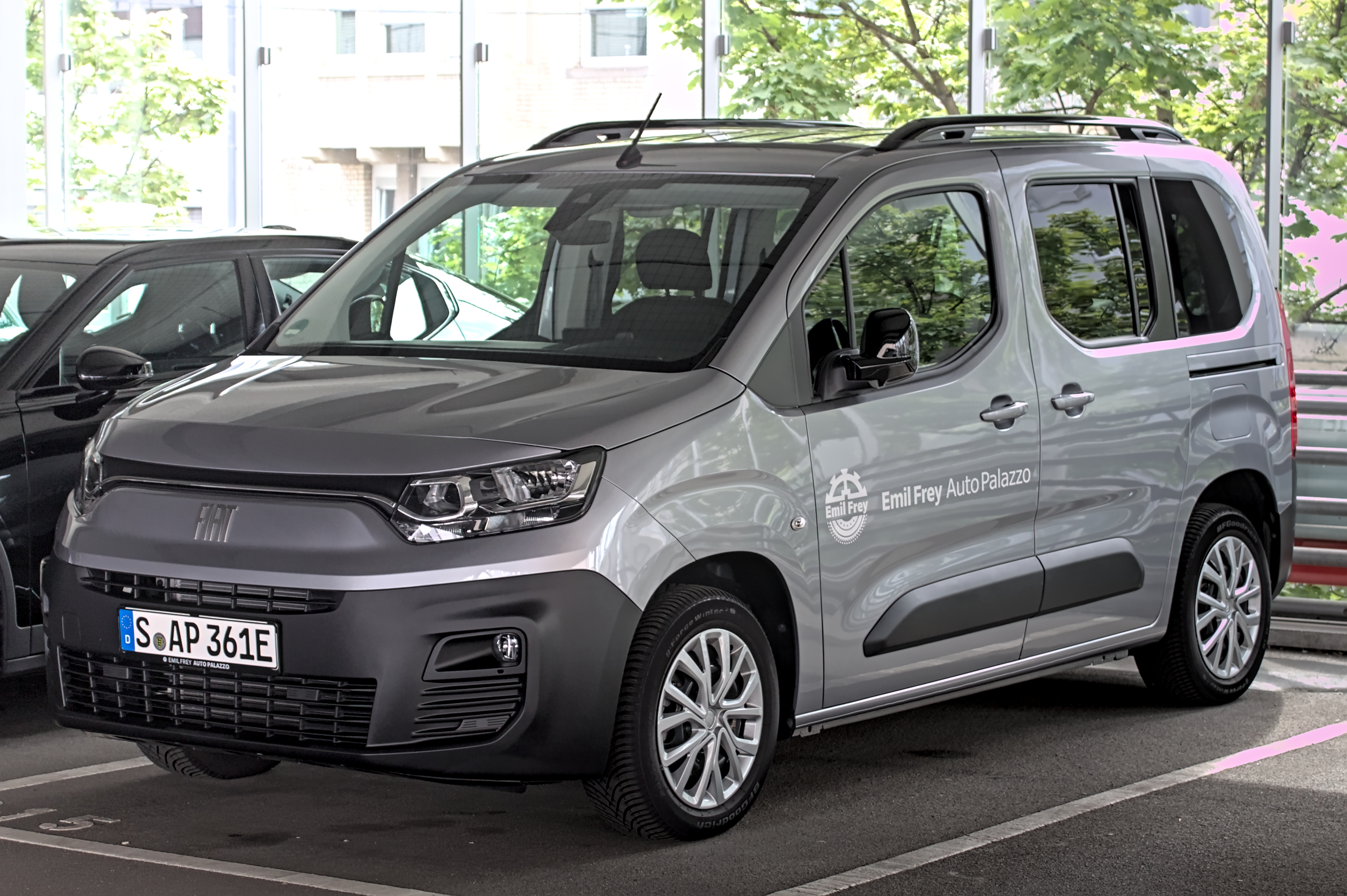
Fiat E-Doblò passenger variant

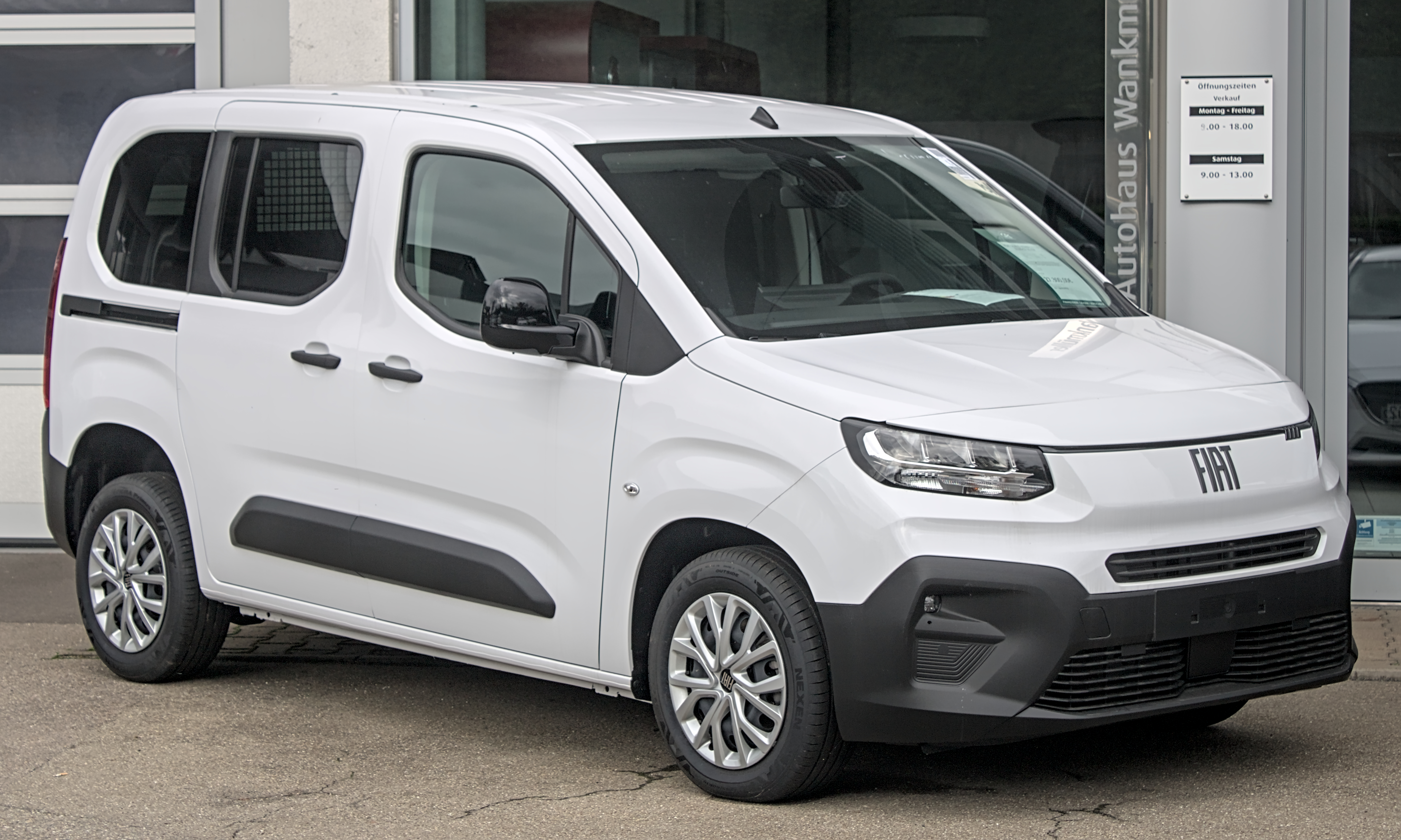
Fiat Doblò (facelift)
