= List of films in the Criterion Collection =

List of films released by the home distribution company The Criterion Collection

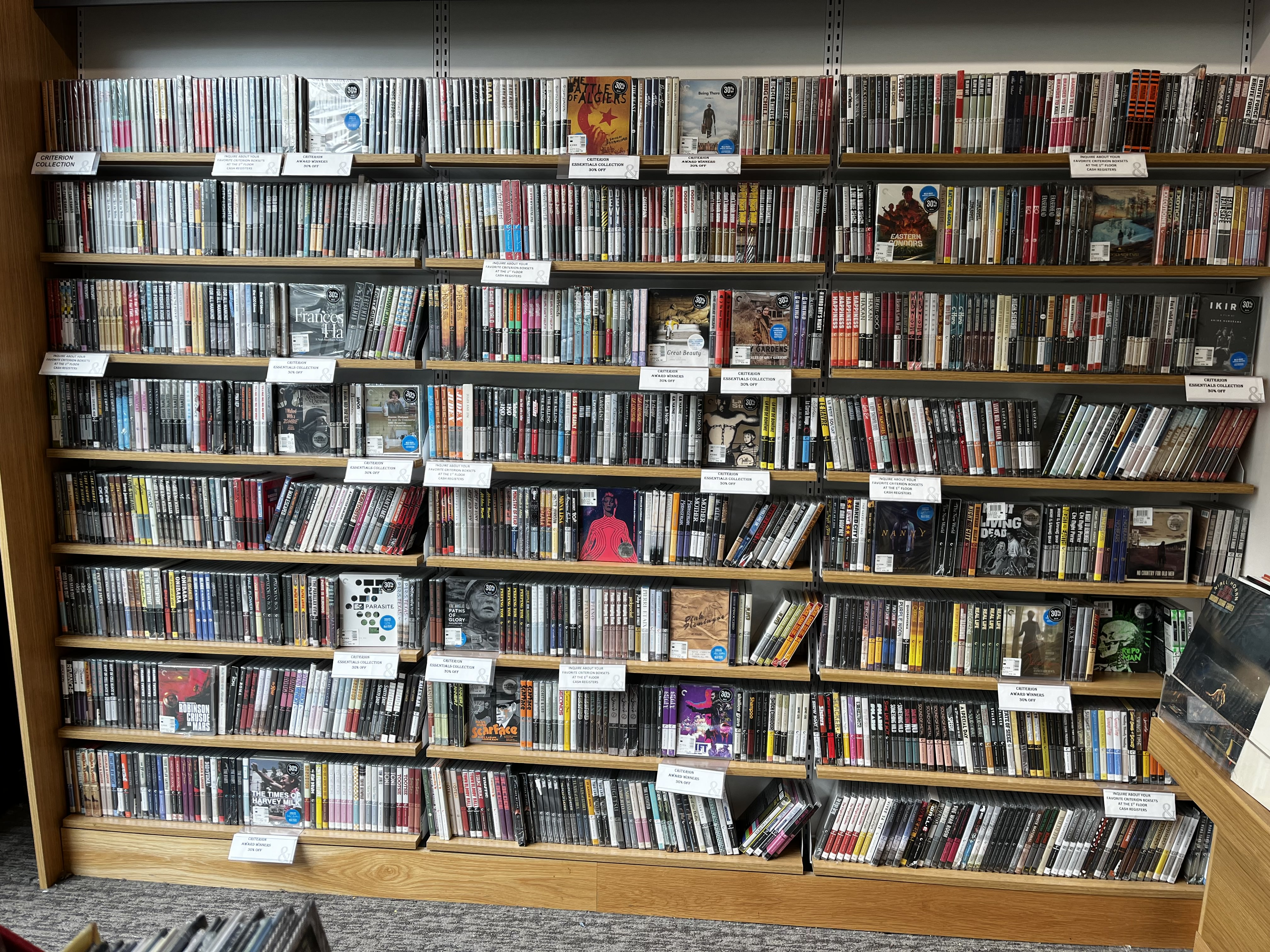
A display of Criterion Collection DVDs on sale at Barnes & Noble

The Criterion Collection is a home distribution company which licenses, restores, and distributes "important classic and contemporary films". The Criterion Collection is considered one of the leading boutique Blu-ray labels, and release through the company is seen as "a mark of prestige for filmmakers", with filmmaker John Waters stating that a film being released by the company is "like getting a plenary indulgence from the Pope". While the Criterion Collection began releasing films originally on LaserDisc and VHS, it switched to DVD (and eventually Blu-Ray) in 1998.

In 2019, the Criterion Collection launched Criterion Channel, a streaming service featuring films not officially released by the collection on physical media and not considered part of the collection. Likewise, films released by Janus Films, the Criterion Collection's parent company, on physical media are not considered part of the collection. The collection contains films from sixty-one different countries, as well as several television miniseries.

== List of individually-released films ==
Films released by the Criterion Collection are designated a "spine number" to denote the order of their release. Beginning with the release of films on DVD, the company restarted their spine numbering, with the first DVD release being designated the first spine number. In consequence, several films released only on LaserDisc have the same spine number as an unrelated film released on DVD. A film released individually that is later re-released as part of box sets retain the same spine number. The film's country of origin is based on the Criterion Collection's designation. Films released on both DVD and Blu-ray are designated the same spine number by the Criterion Collection, hence this list uses the spine number of DVD releases unless otherwise noted for all films.

* Only released on LaserDisc
† Released on LaserDisc and DVD

Spine	Film	Film Release Year	Director	Country	Notes
1 (Note: Released on LaserDisc as Spine #25)	Grand Illusion^{†}	1937	Jean Renoir	France	First French film in the collection
2 (Note: Released on LaserDisc as Spine #67)	Seven Samurai^{†}	1954	Akira Kurosawa	Japan	First Japanese film in the collection
2	King Kong*	1933	Merian Cooper	United States	First American film in the collection (on LaserDisc)
3 (Note: Released on LaserDisc as Spine #4)	The Lady Vanishes^{†}	1938	Alfred Hitchcock	United Kingdom	First British film in the collection
4 (Note: Released on LaserDisc as Spine #270)	Amarcord^{†}	1973	Federico Fellini	Italy	First Italian film in the collection
5 (Note: Released on LaserDisc as spine #173)	The 400 Blows^{†}	1959	François Truffaut	France	
6 (Note: Released on LaserDisc as spine #128)	Beauty and the Beast^{†}	1946	Jean Cocteau	France	
7 (Note: Released on LaserDisc as Spine #250)	A Night to Remember^{†}	1958	Roy Ward Baker	United Kingdom	
7 (Note: Released on LaserDisc as Spine #7)	High Noon*	1952	Fred Zinnemann	United States	
8 (Note: Released on LaserDisc as Spine #11 and Spine #284 for CAV and CLV respectively)	The Killer^{†}	1989	John Woo	Hong Kong	First film in the collection from Hong Kong
8	Invasion of the Body Snatchers*	1956	Don Siegel	United States	
9 (Note: Released on LaserDisc as Spine #245 and Spine #308 for CAV and CLV respectively)	Hard Boiled^{†}	1992	John Woo	Hong Kong	
10 (Note: Released on LaserDisc as Spine #351)	Walkabout^{†}	1971	Nicolas Roeg	United Kingdom	
11 (Note: Released on LaserDisc as Spine #10)	The Seventh Seal^{†}	1957	Ingmar Bergman	Sweden	First Swedish film in the collection
12 (Note: Released on LaserDisc as Spine #238 and Spine #319 for CAV and CLV respectively)	This is Spinal Tap^{†}	1984	Rob Reiner	United States	First American film in the collection (on DVD)
13 (Note: Released on LaserDisc as Spine #192 and Spine #314 for CAV and CLV respectively)	The Silence of the Lambs^{†}	1991	Jonathan Demme	United States	
14 (Note: Released on LaserDisc as Spine #176)	Samurai I: Musashi Miyamoto^{†}	1954	Hiroshi Inagaki	Japan	
15 (Note: Released on LaserDisc as Spine #177)	Samurai II: Duel at Ichijoji Temple^{†}	1955	Hiroshi Inagaki	Japan	
16 (Note: Released on LaserDisc as Spine #178)	Samurai III: Duel at Ganryu Island^{†}	1956	Hiroshi Inagaki	Japan	
16	Help!*	1965	Richard Lester	United Kingdom	
17 (Note: Released on LaserDisc as Spine #209)	Salò, or the 120 Days of Sodom^{†}	1976	Pier Paolo Pasolini	Italy	
18 (Note: Released on LaserDisc as Spine #77)	The Naked Kiss^{†}	1964	Samuel Fuller	United States	
18	It's a Wonderful Life*	1946	Frank Capra	United States	
19 (Note: Released on LaserDisc as Spine #15)	Shock Corridor^{†}	1963	Samuel Fuller	United States	
19	Blade Runner*	1982	Ridley Scott	United States	
20 (Note: Released on LaserDisc as Spine #241)	Sid & Nancy^{†}	1986	Alex Cox	United Kingdom	
21 (Note: Released on LaserDisc as Spine #305 and Spine #372 for CAV and CLV respectively)	Dead Ringers^{†}	1988	David Cronenberg	United States	
22 (Note: Released on LaserDisc as Spine #116)	Summertime^{†}	1955	David Lean	United States	
22	Sabotage*	1936	Alfred Hitchcock	United States	
23 (Note: Released on LaserDisc as Spine #198 and Spine #311 for CAV and CLV respectively)	RoboCop^{†}	1987	Paul Verhoeven	United States	
23	Secret Agent*	1936	Alfred Hitchcock	United Kingdom	
24 (Note: Released on LaserDisc as Spine #382)	High and Low^{†}	1963	Akira Kurosawa	Japan	
24	Young and Innocent*	1937	Alfred Hitchcock	United Kingdom	
25 (Note: Released on LaserDisc as spine #274)	Alphaville^{†}	1965	Jean-Luc Godard	France	
26 (Note: Released on LaserDisc as Spine #331)	The Long Good Friday^{†}	1980	John Mackenzie	United Kingdom	
27 (Note: Released on LaserDisc as Spine #288)	Flesh for Frankenstein^{†}	1973	Paul Morrissey	United States	
28 (Note: Released on LaserDisc as spine #287)	Blood for Dracula^{†}	1974	Paul Morrissey	United States	
29 (Note: Released on LaserDisc as Spine #383)	Picnic at Hanging Rock^{†}	1975	Peter Weir	Australia	First Australian film in the collection
30 (Note: Released on LaserDisc as Spine #356)	M^{†}	1931	Fritz Lang	Germany	First German film in the collection
31	Great Expectations^{†}	1946	David Lean	United Kingdom	
31	A Night at the Opera*	1935	Sam Wood	United States	
32 (Note: Released on LaserDisc as Spine #267)	Oliver Twist^{†}	1948	David Lean	United Kingdom	
32	Scaramouche*	1952	George Sidney	United States	
33	Nanook of the North	1922	Robert Flaherty	United States	First documentary film in the collection
34 (Note: Released on LaserDisc as spine #222)	Andrei Rublev^{†}	1966	Andrei Tarkovsky	Soviet Union	First film in the collection from the Soviet Union
35 (Note: Released on LaserDisc as Spine #138)	Diabolique^{†}	1955	Henri-Georges Clouzot	France	
36 (Note: Released on LaserDisc as Spine #127)	The Wages for Fear^{†}	1953	Henri-Georges Clouzot	France	
36	The Producers*	1967	Mel Brooks	United States	
37 (Note: Released on LaserDisc as Spine #354)	Time Bandits^{†}	1981	Terry Gilliam	United Kingdom	
38 (Note: Released on LaserDisc as spine #361)	Branded to Kill^{†}	1967	Seijun Suzuki	Japan	
39 (Note: Released on LaserDisc as Spine #362)	Tokyo Drifter^{†}	1966	Seijun Suzuki	Japan	
40 (Note: Released on LaserDisc as spine #384)	Armageddon^{†}	1998	Michael Bay	United States	
41 (Note: Released on LaserDisc as Spine #258)	Henry V^{†}	1944	Laurence Olivier	United Kingdom	
42	Fishing with John	1992	John Lurie	United States	First television miniseries in the collection
43 (Note: Released on LaserDisc as Spine #185)	Lord of the Flies^{†}	1963	Peter Brook	United Kingdom	
44 (Note: Released on LaserDisc as Spine #249)	The Red Shoes^{†}	1948	Michael Powell, Emeric Pressburger	United Kingdom	
45	Taste of Cherry	1997	Abbas Kiarostami	Iran	First Iranian film in the collection
45	North by Northwest*	1959	Alfred Hitchcock	United States	
46	The Most Dangerous Game	1932	Ernest B. Schoedsack, Irving Pichel	United States	
47	Insomnia	1997	Erik Skjoldbjærg	Norway	First Norwegian film in the collection
47	Adam's Rib*	1949	George Cukor	United States	
48 (Note: Released on LaserDisc as spine #13)	Black Orpheus^{†}	1959	Marcel Camus	France	
49	Nights of Cabiria	1957	Federico Fellini	Italy	
50	And the Ship Sails On	1983	Federico Fellini	Italy	
51 (Note: Released on LaserDisc as spine #196)	Brazil^{†}	1985	Terry Gilliam	United Kingdom	
51	Singin' in the Rain*	1952	Stanley Donen, Gene Kelly	United States	
52 (Note: Released on LaserDisc as Spine #105)	Yojimbo^{†}	1961	Akira Kurosawa	Japan	
53 (Note: Released on LaserDisc as Spine #218)	Sanjuro^{†}	1962	Akira Kurosawa	Japan	
53	Forbidden Planet*	1956	Fred Wilcox	United States	
54	For All Mankind	1989	Al Reinert	United States	
32	Zulu*	1964	Cy Endfield	United Kingdom	
55 (Note: Released on LaserDisc as Spine #357)	The Unbearable Lightness of Being^{†}	1988	Philip Kaufman	United States	
55	Darling*	1965	John Schlesinger	United Kingdom	
56 (Note: Released on LaserDisc as spine #3)	The 39 Steps^{†}	1935	Alfred Hitchcock	United Kingdom	
57	Charade	1963	Stanley Donen	United States	
58 (Note: Released on LaserDisc as Spine #156)	Peeping Tom^{†}	1960	Michael Powell	United Kingdom	
59 (Note: Released on LaserDisc as Spine #359)	The Night Porter^{†}	1974	Liliana Cavani	Italy	First film in the collection by a female director
55	The Wizard of Oz*	1939	Victor Fleming	United States	
60 (Note: Released on LaserDisc as spine #255)	Autumn Sonata^{†}	1978	Ingmar Bergman	Sweden	
61 (Note: Released on LaserDisc as Spine #353)	Monty Python's Life of Brian^{†}	1979	Terry Jones	United Kingdom	
62	The Passion of Joan of Arc	1928	Carl Theodor Dreyer	France	
63	Carnival of Souls	1962	Herk Harvey	United States	
64 (Note: Released on LaserDisc as Spine #5)	The Third Man^{†}	1949	Carol Reed	United Kingdom	
65	Rushmore	1998	Wes Anderson	United States	
66	The Adventures of Robin Hood*	1938	Michael Curtiz	United States	
70 (Note: Released on LaserDisc as Spine #352)	The Last Temptation of Christ^{†}	1988	Martin Scorsese	United States	
71 (Note: Released on LaserDisc as Spine #273)	The Magic Flute^{†}	1975	Ingmar Bergman	Sweden	
72	Le Million	1931	René Clair	France	
72	West Side Story*	1961	Robert Wise	United States	
73 (Note: Released on LaserDisc as Spine #364)	Cléo from 5 to 7^{†}	1962	Agnès Varda	France	
73	Casablanca*	1942	Michael Curtiz	United States	
74 (Note: Released on LaserDisc as Spine #363)	Vagabond^{†}	1985	Agnès Varda	France	
75 (Note: Released on LaserDisc as spine #360)	Chasing Amy^{†}	1997	Kevin Smith	United States	
75	Ghostbusters*	1984	Ivan Reitman	United States	
76 (Note: Released on LaserDisc as spine #248)	Brief Encounter^{†}	1945	David Lean	United Kingdom	
77	And God Created Woman	1956	Roger Vadim	France	
78	The Bank Dick	1940	Edward Cline	United States	
78	Lawrence of Arabia*	1962	David Lean	United States	
80	The Element of Crime	1984	Lars von Trier	Denmark	First Danish film in the collection
81 (Note: Released on LaserDisc as Spine #279)	Variety Lights^{†}	1950	Federico Fellini, Alberto Lattuada	Italy	
82 (Note: Released on LaserDisc as Spine #296)	Hamlet^{†}	1948	Laurence Olivier	United Kingdom	
83 (Note: Released on LaserDisc as Spine #147)	The Harder They Come^{†}	1972	Perry Henzell	United States	
84 (Note: Released on LaserDisc as Spine #368)	Good Morning^{†}	1959	Yasujirō Ozu	Japan	
85 (Note: Released on LaserDisc as Spine #33)	Pygmalion^{†}	1938	Anthony Asquith, Leslie Howard	United Kingdom	
89	Sisters	1973	Brian De Palma	United States	
90 (Note: Released on LaserDisc as Spine #119)	Kwaidan^{†}	1965	Masaki Kobayashi	Japan	
91 (Note: Released on LaserDisc as spine #65)	The Blob^{†}	1958	Irvin S. Yeaworth Jr.	United States	
92	Fiend Without a Face	1958	Arthur Crabtree	United Kingdom	
93 (Note: Released on LaserDisc as spine #38)	Black Narcissus^{†}	1947	Michael Powell, Emeric Pressburger	United Kingdom	
93	Annie Hall*	1977	Woody Allen	United States	
94 (Note: Released on LaserDisc as Spine #237)	I Know Where I'm Going!^{†}	1945	Michael Powell, Emeric Pressburger	United Kingdom	
95	All That Heaven Allows	1955	Douglas Sirk	United States	
96	Written on the Wind	1956	Douglas Sirk	United States	
97	Do the Right Thing^{†}	1989	Spike Lee	United States	
98 (Note: Released on LaserDisc as spine #62)	L'Avventura^{†}	1960	Michelangelo Antonioni	Italy	
99	Gimme Shelter	1970	Albert Maysles, David Maysles, Charlotte Zwerin	United States	
99	Burn!*	1969	Gillo Pontecorvo	Italy	
101	Cries and Whispers^{†}	1972	Ingmar Bergman	Sweden	
102	The Discreet Charm of the Bourgeoisie	1972	Luis Buñuel	France	
103	The Lady Eve	1941	Preston Sturges	United States	
104 (Note: Released on LaserDisc as Spine #367)	Double Suicide^{†}	1969	Masahiro Shinoda	Japan	
105 (Note: Released on LaserDisc as Spine #155)	Spartacus^{†}	1960	Stanley Kubrick	United States	
106 (Note: Released on LaserDisc as Spine #275)	Coup de Torchon^{†}	1981	Bertrand Tavernier	France	
107 (Note: Released on LaserDisc as Spine #347)	Mona Lisa^{†}	1986	Neil Jordan	United Kingdom	
108 (Note: Released on LaserDisc as Spine #334)	The Rock^{†}	1996	Michael Bay	United States	
109	The Scarlet Empress	1934	Josef von Sternberg	United States	
109	Taxi Driver*	1976	Martin Scorsese	United States	
110 (Note: Released on LaserDisc as Spine #21)	Monsieur Hulot's Holiday^{†}	1953	Jacques Tati	France	
111 (Note: Released on LaserDisc as Spine #101)	Mon Oncle^{†}	1958	Jacques Tati	France	
112	PlayTime	1967	Jacques Tati	France	
112	The Lacemaker*	1977	Claude Goretta	France	
113 (Note: Released on LaserDisc as spine #321)	Big Deal on Madonna Street^{†}	1958	Mario Monicelli	Italy	
114	My Man Godfrey	1936	Gregory La Cava	United States	
115	Rififi	1955	Jules Dassin	France	
115	King of Hearts*	1966	Philippe de Broca	France	
116 (Note: Released on LaserDisc as Spine #11 and Spine #232 for CAV and CLV respectively)	The Hidden Fortress^{†}	1958	Akira Kurosawa	Japan	
117	Diary of a Chambermaid	1964	Luis Buñuel	France	
118	Sullivan's Travels	1941	Preston Sturges	United States	
118	Silverado*	1985	Lawrence Kasdan	United States	
119 (Note: Released on LaserDisc as Spine #339)	Withnail and I^{†}	1987	Bruce Robinson	United Kingdom	
120 (Note: Released on LaserDisc as Spine #340)	How to Get Ahead in Advertising^{†}	1989	Bruce Robinson	United Kingdom	
121	Billy Liar	1963	John Schlesinger	United Kingdom	
122	Salesman	1969	Albert Maysles, David Maysles, Charlotte Zwerin	United States	
122	Last Tango in Paris*	1972	Bernardo Bertolucci	Italy	
123	Grey Gardens	1975	Albert Maysles, David Maysles, Ellen Hovde, Muffie Meyer	United States	
124	Dr. No*	1962	Terence Young	United Kingdom	
125	Close Encounters of the Third Kind*	1977	Steven Spielberg	United States	
129	Le Trou	1960	Jacques Becker	France	
130	The Shop on Main Street	1965	Ján Kadár, Elmar Klos	Czechoslovakia	First Czech film in the collection
131	Closely Watched Trains	1966	Jiří Menzel	Czechoslovakia	
131	From Russia with Love*	1963	Terence Young	United Kingdom	
132	The Ruling Class	1972	Peter Medak	United Kingdom	
132	Goldfinger*	1964	Guy Hamilton	United Kingdom	
133	The Vanishing	1988	George Sluizer	France	
133	Bad Day at Black Rock*	1955	John Sturges	United States	
134	Häxan	1922	Benjamin Christensen	Denmark	
135 (Note: Released on LaserDisc as Spine #98)	Rebecca^{†}	1940	Alfred Hitchcock	United States	
136	Spellbound	1945	Alfred Hitchcock	United States	
137 (Note: Released on LaserDisc as Spine #100)	Notorious^{†}	1946	Alfred Hitchcock	United States	
137	Lady for a Day*	1933	Frank Capra	United States	
138 (Note: Released on LaserDisc as Spine #49)	Rashomon^{†}	1950	Akira Kurosawa	Japan	
139 (Note: Released on LaserDisc as Spine #85)	Wild Strawberries^{†}	1957	Ingmar Bergman	Sweden	
140 (Note: Released on LaserDisc as spine #71)	8½^{†}	1963	Federico Fellini	Italy	
141 (Note: Released on LaserDisc as spine #84)	Children of Paradise^{†}	1945	Marcel Carné	France	
141	Carrie*	1976	Brian De Palma	United States	
142	The Last Wave	1977	Peter Weir	Australia	
143 (Note: Released on LaserDisc as Spine #113)	That Obscure Object of Desire^{†}	1977	Luis Buñuel	France	
144	Loves of a Blonde	1965	Miloš Forman	Czechoslovakia	
145	The Firemen's Ball	1967	Miloš Forman	Czechoslovakia	
146	The Cranes Are Flying	1957	Mikhail Kalatozov	Soviet Union	
147	In the Mood for Love	2000	Wong Kar-wai	Hong Kong	
148	Ballad of a Soldier	1959	Grigory Chukhray	Soviet Union	
149	Juliet of the Spirits	1965	Federico Fellini	Italy	
150	Bob le Flambeur	1956	Jean-Pierre Melville	France	
151	Traffic	2000	Steven Soderbergh	United States	
151 (Note: Both films were designated the number 151 on The Criterion Channel's official website and released this way for an unknown reason.)	Akira*	1988	Katsuhiro Otomo	Japan	First animated film in the collection (on LaserDisc)
151	Letter from an Unknown Woman*	1948	Max Ophüls	United States	
152	George Washington	2000	David Gordon Green	United States	
153	General Idi Amin Dada: A Self-Portrait	1974	Barbet Schroeder	France	
154 (Note: Released on LaserDisc as Spine #42 and Spine #292 for CAV and CLV respectively)	The Horse's Mouth^{†}	1958	Ronald Neame	United Kingdom	
154	Blackmail*	1929	Alfred Hitchcock	United Kingdom	
155 (Note: Released on LaserDisc as Spine #117)	Tokyo Olympiad^{†}	1965	Kon Ichikawa	Japan	
156	Hearts and Minds	1974	Peter Davis	United States	
157	The Royal Tenenbaums	2001	Wes Anderson	United States	First film released from the 21st century
158 (Note: Released on LaserDisc as Spine #265)	The Importance of Being Earnest^{†}	1952	Anthony Asquith	United Kingdom	
159 (Note: Released on LaserDisc as Spine #82)	Red Beard^{†}	1965	Akira Kurosawa	Japan	
160	À Nous la Liberté	1931	René Clair	France	
160	Jason and the Argonauts*	1963	Don Chaffey	United States	
161	Under the Roofs of Paris	1930	René Clair	France	
162	Ratcatcher	1999	Lynne Ramsay	United Kingdom	
163	Hopscotch	1980	Ronald Neame	United States	
164	Solaris	1972	Andrei Tarkovsky	Soviet Union	
165 (Note: Released on LaserDisc as Spine #215)	Man Bites Dog^{†}	1992	Rémy Belvaux, André Bonzel, Benoît Poelvoorde	Belgium	First Belgian film in the collection
166	Down by Law	1986	Jim Jarmusch	United States	
168	Monty Python and the Holy Grail*	1975	Terry Gilliam, Terry Jones	United Kingdom	
170	Trouble in Paradise	1932	Ernst Lubitsch	United States	
171	Contempt	1963	Jean-Luc Godard	France	
172	Pépé le Moko	1937	Julien Duvivier	France	
173 (Note: Released on LaserDisc as Spine #37)	The Life and Death of Colonel Blimp^{†}	1943	Michael Powell, Emeric Pressburger	United Kingdom	
174	Band of Outsiders	1964	Jean-Luc Godard	France	
175	Fear and Loathing in Las Vegas	1998	Terry Gilliam	United States	
177	The Lost Honor of Katharina Blum	1975	Volker Schlöndorff, Margarethe von Trotta	Germany	
178	My Life as a Dog	1985	Lasse Hallström	Sweden	
182	Straw Dogs	1971	Sam Peckinpah	United States	
182	Damage*	1992	Louis Malle	United Kingdom	
183	Les Dames du Bois de Boulogne	1945	Robert Bresson	France	
183	Bram Stoker's Dracula*	1992	Francis Ford Coppola	United States	
187	Confidentially Yours*	1983	François Truffaut	France	
189	The White Sheik	1952	Federico Fellini	Italy	
189	Edward II*	1991	Derek Jarman	United Kingdom	
190 (Note: Released on LaserDisc as Spine #106 and Spine #239 for CAV and CLV respectively)	Throne of Blood^{†}	1957	Akira Kurosawa	Japan	
191	Jubilee	1978	Derek Jarman	United Kingdom	
192	Coup de Grâce	1976	Volker Schlöndorff	Germany	
193	Quai des Orfèvres	1947	Henri-Georges Clouzot	France	
194	Il Posto	1961	Ermanno Olmi	Italy	
195	I Fidanzati	1962	Ermanno Olmi	Italy	
196	Hiroshima Mon Amour	1959	Alain Resnais	France	
197	Night and Fog	1955	Alain Resnais	France	
198	Ali: Fear Eats the Soul	1974	Rainer Werner Fassbinder	Germany	
199	Schizopolis	1996	Steven Soderbergh	United States	
200	The Honeymoon Killers	1969	Leonard Kastle	United States	
201 (Note: Released on LaserDisc as Spine #107)	Umberto D.^{†}	1952	Vittorio De Sica	Italy	
202	Indiscretion of an American Wife	1953	Vittorio De Sica	United States	
203	Get Out Your Handkerchiefs*	1978	Bertrand Blier	France	
204	Evergreen*	1934	Victor Saville	United Kingdom	
207	The Pornographers	1966	Shōhei Imamura	Japan	
212	Ingmar Bergman Makes a Movie	1963	Vilgot Sjöman	Sweden	
213 (Note: Released on LaserDisc as Spine #190)	Richard III^{†}	1955	Laurence Olivier	United Kingdom	
213	Salt of the Earth*	1954	Herbert Biberman	United States	
214 (Note: Released on LaserDisc as Spine #126)	All That Money Can Buy (a.k.a. The Devil and Daniel Webster)^{†}	1941	William Dieterle	United States	
215 (Note: Released on LaserDisc as Spine #134)	Knife in the Water	1962	Roman Polanski	Poland	First Polish film in the collection
216 (Note: Released on LaserDisc as Spine #50)	The Rules of the Game^{†}	1939	Jean Renoir	France	
216	Bodies, Rest & Motion*	1993	Michael Steinberg	United States	
217	Tokyo Story	1953	Yasujirō Ozu	Japan	
218	Le Cercle Rouge	1970	Jean-Pierre Melville	France	
219 (Note: Released on LaserDisc as Spine #29)	La Strada^{†}	1954	Federico Fellini	Italy	
220	Naked Lunch	1991	David Cronenberg	Canada	First Canadian film in the collection
221 (Note: Released on LaserDisc as Spine #114)	Ikiru^{†}	1952	Akira Kurosawa	Japan	
222	Diary of a Country Priest	1951	Robert Bresson	France	
223	Maîtresse	1976	Barbet Schroeder	France	
224	Pickup on South Street	1953	Samuel Fuller	United States	
225 (Note: Released on LaserDisc as Spine #41)	Tunes of Glory^{†}	1960	Ronald Neame	United Kingdom	
225	Two English Girls*	1971	François Truffaut	France	
226 (Note: Released on LaserDisc as Spine #369)	Onibaba^{†}	1964	Kaneto Shindo	Japan	
226	The Last Laugh*	1924	F.W. Murnau	Germany	
227	Le Corbeau	1943	Henri-Georges Clouzot	France	
228	Salvatore Giuliano	1962	Francesco Rosi	Italy	
229 (Note: Released on LaserDisc as Spine #293)	Scenes from a Marriage^{†}	1973	Ingmar Bergman	Sweden	
229	She's Gotta Have It*	1986	Spike Lee	United States	
230	3 Women	1977	Robert Altman	United States	
231	The Testament of Dr. Mabuse	1933	Fritz Lang	Germany	
233 (Note: Released on LaserDisc as Spine #370)	Stray Dog^{†}	1949	Akira Kurosawa	Japan	
234	The Tin Drum	1979	Volker Schlöndorff	Germany	
235	The Leopard	1963	Luchino Visconti	Italy	
236	Mamma Roma	1962	Pier Paolo Pasolini	Italy	
236	The Woman Next Door*	1981	François Truffaut	France	
237 (Note: Released on LaserDisc as Spine #86)	Smiles of a Summer Night^{†}	1955	Ingmar Bergman	Sweden	
238	A Woman Is a Woman	1961	Jean-Luc Godard	France	
240 (Note: Released on LaserDisc as Spine #332)	Early Summer^{†}	1951	Yasujirō Ozu	Japan	
244	David Holzman's Diary*	1967	Jim McBride	United States	
245	Port of Shadows	1938	Marcel Carné	France	
246	I Vitelloni	1953	Federico Fellini	Italy	
247	Slacker	1991	Richard Linklater	United States	
247	Halloween*	1978	John Carpenter	United States	
248	Videodrome	1983	David Cronenberg	Canada	
249	The Battle of Algiers	1966	Gillo Pontecorvo	Italy	
256	A Constant Forge	2000	Charles Kiselyak	United States	
256	Dersu Uzala*	1975	Akira Kurosawa	Japan	
257 (Note: Released on LaserDisc as Spine #161)	Secret Honor^{†}	1984	Robert Altman	United States	
258	Tanner '88	1988	Robert Altman	United States	
259	Fat Girl	2001	Catherine Breillat	France	
260	Eyes Without a Face	1960	Georges Franju	France	
261	Three Cases of Murder*	1955	David Eady	United Kingdom	
265 (Note: Released on LaserDisc as Spine #231)	Short Cuts^{†}	1993	Robert Altman	United States	
266 (Note: Released on LaserDisc as Spine #152)	The King of Kings^{†}	1927	Cecil B. DeMille	United States	
267	Kagemusha	1980	Akira Kurosawa	Japan	
268	Youth of the Beast	1963	Seijun Suzuki	Japan	
269	Fighting Elegy	1966	Seijun Suzuki	Japan	
270	Casque d'Or	1952	Jacques Becker	France	
271	Touchez pas au grisbi	1954	Jacques Becker	France	
271	Pulp Fiction*	1994	Quentin Tarantino	United States	
272	La Commare Secca	1962	Bernardo Bertolucci	Italy	
273	Thieves' Highway	1949	Jules Dassin	United States	
274	Night and the City	1950	Jules Dassin	United States	
275	Tout va bien	1972	Jean-Luc Godard, Jean-Pierre Gorin	France	
276 (Note: Released on LaserDisc as Spine #70)	The River^{†}	1951	Jean Renoir	France	
277	My Own Private Idaho	1991	Gus Van Sant	United States	
278	L'eclisse	1962	Michelangelo Antonioni	Italy	
279	Young Törless	1966	Volker Schlöndorff	Germany	
280 (Note: Released on LaserDisc as Spine #294)	The Sword of Doom^{†}	1966	Kihachi Okamoto	Japan	
281 (Note: Released on LaserDisc as Spine #165)	Jules and Jim^{†}	1962	François Truffaut	France	
282	Once Were Warriors*	1994	Lee Tamahori	New Zealand	First film in the collection from New Zealand (on LaserDisc)
285	The Atomic Cafe*	1982	Kevin Rafferty	United States	
286	Divorce Italian Style	1961	Pietro Germi	Italy	
286	Why Has Bodhi-Dharma Left for the East?*	1989	Bae Yong-kyun	South Korea	First South Korean film in the collection (on LaserDisc)
287	Burden of Dreams	1982	Les Blank	United States	
288 (Note: Released on LaserDisc as Spine #143)	F for Fake^{†}	1975	Orson Welles	United States	
289	Hoop Dreams	1994	Steve James	United States	
290	The Phantom of Liberty	1974	Luis Buñuel	France	
291	Heaven Can Wait	1943	Ernst Lubitsch	United States	
292	Unfaithfully Yours	1948	Preston Sturges	United States	
293	The Flowers of St. Francis	1950	Roberto Rossellini	Italy	
294	The Browning Version	1951	Anthony Asquith	United Kingdom	
295	Crazed Fruit	1956	Kō Nakahira	Japan	
296	Le Notti Bianche	1957	Luchino Visconti	Italy	
297	Au hasard Balthazar	1966	Robert Bresson	France	
298	Gate of Flesh	1964	Seijun Suzuki	Japan	
298	Seven*	1995	David Fincher	United States	
299	Story of a Prostitute	1965	Seijun Suzuki	Japan	
299	Tristana*	1970	Luis Buñuel	Spain	First Spanish film in the collection (on LaserDisc)
300	The Life Aquatic with Steve Zissou	2004	Wes Anderson	United States	
300	Waltz of the Toreadors*	1962	John Guillermin	United Kingdom	
301	An Angel at My Table	1990	Jane Campion	New Zealand	First film in the collection from New Zealand (on DVD)
300	Dead Presidents*	1995	Albert Hughes, Allen Hughes	United States	
302	Harikari	1962	Masaki Kobayashi	Japan	
303	Bad Timing	1980	Nicolas Roeg	United Kingdom	
304 (Note: Released on LaserDisc as Spine #169)	The Man Who Fell to Earth^{†}	1976	Nicolas Roeg	United States	
304	El Cid*	1961	Anthony Mann	Italy	
305	Boudu Saved from Drowning	1932	Jean Renoir	France	
306	Le Samouraï	1967	Jean-Pierre Melville	France	
307 (Note: Released on LaserDisc as Spine #234)	Naked^{†}	1993	Mike Leigh	United Kingdom	
308	Masculin Féminin	1966	Jean-Luc Godard	France	
309 (Note: Released on LaserDisc as Spine #174)	Ugetsu^{†}	1953	Kenji Mizoguchi	Japan	
309	Diva*	1961	Jean-Jacques Beineix	France	
310	Samurai Rebellion	1967	Masaki Kobayashi	Japan	
311	Sword of the Beast	1965	Hideo Gosha	Japan	
312	Samurai Spy	1965	Masahiro Shinoda	Japan	
312	The Entertainer*	1960	Tony Richardson	United Kingdom	
313	Kill!	1968	Kihachi Okamoto	Japan	
313	Swept Away*	1975	Lina Wertmüller	Italy	
314	Pickpocket	1959	Robert Bresson	France	
315	Shoot the Piano Player^{†}	1960	François Truffaut	France	
315	The Return of Martin Guerre*	1982	Daniel Vigne	France	
316	Ran	1985	Akira Kurosawa	Japan	
317 (Note: Released on LaserDisc as Spine #157)	The Tales of Hoffmann^{†}	1951	Michael Powell, Emeric Pressburger	United Kingdom	
317 (Note: Released on LaserDisc as Spine #317)	Montenegro*	1981	Dušan Makavejev	Sweden	
318 (Note: Released on LaserDisc as Spine #30)	Forbidden Games^{†}	1952	René Clément	France	
319 (Note: Released on LaserDisc as spine #371)	The Bad Sleep Well^{†}	1960	Akira Kurosawa	Japan	
320	Young Mr. Lincoln	1939	John Ford	United States	
321 (Note: Released on LaserDisc as Spine #277)	The Virgin Spring^{†}	1960	Ingmar Bergman	Sweden	
322 (Note: Released on LaserDisc as Spine #121)	Mr. Arkadin^{†} (Note: Released under the title The Complete Mr. Arkadin)	1955	Orson Welles	France	
323	The Children Are Watching Us	1944	Vittorio De Sica	Italy	
323	Crimes and Misdemeanors*	1989	Woody Allen	United States	
324	La Bête Humaine	1938	Jean Renoir	France	
325	Kind Hearts and Coronets	1949	Robert Hamer	United Kingdom	
326	Metropolitan	1990	Whit Stillman	United States	
326	A Personal Journey with Martin Scorsese Through American Movies*	1995	Martin Scorsese	United Kingdom	
327	Supercop*	1992	Stanley Tong	Hong Kong	
331	Late Spring	1949	Yasujirō Ozu	Japan	
332	Viridiana	1961	Luis Buñuel	Spain	First Spanish film in the collection (on DVD)
333	Fists in the Pocket	1965	Marco Bellocchio	Italy	
334	Harlan County USA	1976	Barbara Kopple	United States	
335	Elevator to the Gallows	1958	Louis Malle	France	
335	Shine*	1996	Scott Hicks	Australia	
336	Dazed and Confused	1993	Richard Linklater	United States	
337	À Nos Amours	1983	Maurice Pialat	France	
337	Evita*	1996	Alan Parker	United States	
338	Equinox	1970	Jack Woods	United States	
339	Yi Yi	2000	Edward Yang	Taiwan	
340	Koko: A Talking Gorilla	1978	Barbet Schroeder	France	
341	A Canterbury Tale	1944	Michael Powell, Emeric Pressburger	United Kingdom	
344	Nostalghia*	1983	Andrei Tarkovsky	Soviet Union	
346	Five Corners*	1987	Tony Bill	United States	
349	Kicking and Screaming	1995	Noah Baumbach	United States	
350	Seduced and Abandoned	1964	Pietro Germi	Italy	
350	Sling Blade*	1996	Billy Bob Thornton	United States	
351	The Spirit of the Beehive	1973	Víctor Erice	Spain	
352	Jigoku	1960	Nobuo Nakagawa	Japan	
353	Sólo con tu pareja	1991	Alfonso Cuarón	Mexico	First Mexican film in the collection
354	Clean, Shaven	1994	Lodge Kerrigan	United States	
355	Hands over the City	1963	Francesco Rosi	Italy	
356	Sweetie	1989	Jane Campion	New Zealand	
357	The Fallen Idol	1948	Carol Reed	United Kingdom	
358	Pandora's Box	1929	G.W. Pabst	Germany	
359	The Double Life of Véronique	1991	Krzysztof Kieślowski	France	
361	The Beales of Grey Gardens	2006	Albert Maysles, David Maysles	United States	
362	Border Radio	1987	Allison Anders, Dean Lent, Kurt Voss	United States	
363	Mouchette	1967	Robert Bresson	France	
366	Boogie Nights*	1997	Paul Thomas Anderson	United States	
374	Bicycle Thieves	1948	Vittorio De Sica	Italy	
375 (Note: Released on LaserDisc as Spine #170)	Green for Danger^{†}	1946	Sidney Gilliat	United Kingdom	
376 (Note: Released on LaserDisc as spine #130)	49th Parallel^{†}	1941	Michael Powell	United Kingdom	
377	When a Woman Ascends the Stairs	1960	Mikio Naruse	Japan	
378 (Note: Released on LaserDisc as Spine #276)	Fires on the Plain^{†}	1959	Kon Ichikawa	Japan	
379 (Note: Released on LaserDisc as spine #171)	The Burmese Harp^{†}	1956	Kon Ichikawa	Japan	
380	The Naked City	1948	Jules Dassin	United States	
381	La Haine	1995	Mathieu Kassovitz	France	
382	Overlord	1975	Stuart Cooper	United Kingdom	
383	Brute Force	1947	Jules Dassin	United States	
384 (Note: Released on LaserDisc as Spine #34)	Vengence is Mine^{†}	1979	Shōhei Imamura	Japan	
385	Army of Shadows	1969	Jean-Pierre Melville	France	
386 (Note: Released on LaserDisc as Spine #223)	Sansho the Bailiff^{†}	1954	Kenji Mizoguchi	Japan	
388	The Two of Us	1967	Claude Berri	France	
389	WR: Mysteries of the Organism	1971	Dušan Makavejev	Yugoslavia	First Yugoslavian film in the collection
390	Sweet Movie	1974	Dušan Makavejev	France	
391	If....	1969	Lindsay Anderson	United Kingdom	
396	Ace in the Hole	1951	Billy Wilder	United States	
397	Ivan's Childhood	1962	Andrei Tarkovsky	Soviet Union	
398	Les Enfants Terribles	1950	Jean-Pierre Melville	France	
399	House of Games	1987	David Mamet	United States	
400 (Note: Released on LaserDisc as Spine #307)	Stranger Than Paradise^{†}	1984	Jim Jarmusch	United States	
401	Night on Earth	1991	Jim Jarmusch	United States	
402	The Milky Way	1969	Luis Buñuel	France	
403	Cría Cuervos...	1976	Carlos Saura	Spain	
404 (Note: Released on LaserDisc as Spine #184)	Robinson Crusoe on Mars^{†}	1964	Byron Haskin	United States	
405 (Note: Released on LaserDisc as spine #39)	The Threepenny Opera^{†}	1931	G.W. Pabst	Germany	
406	Martha Graham: Dance on Film	1959	Nathan Kroll	United States	
407	Mala Noche	1985	Gus Van Sant	United States	
408 (Note: Released on LaserDisc as spine #153)	Breathless^{†}	1960	Jean-Luc Godard	France	
409	Days of Heaven	1978	Terrence Malick	United States	
410	Under the Volcano	1984	John Huston	United States	
411	Berlin Alexanderplantz	1980	Rainer Werner Fassbinder	Germany	
412	Sawdust and Tinsel	1953	Ingmar Bergman	Sweden	
413	Drunken Angel	1948	Akira Kurosawa	Japan	
414	Two-Lane Blacktop	1971	Monte Hellman	United States	
415	The Naked Prey	1965	Cornel Wilde	United States	
416	Miss Julie	1951	Alf Sjöberg	Sweden	
417 (Note: Released on LaserDisc as Spine #306)	This Sporting Life^{†}	1963	Lindsay Anderson	United Kingdom	
421	Pierrot Le Fou	1965	Jean-Luc Godard	France	
422	The Last Emperor	1987	Bernardo Bertolucci	China	First Chinese film in the collection
423	Walker	1987	Alex Cox	United States	
424	Mafioso	1962	Alberto Lattuada	Italy	
425	Antonio Gaudí	1984	Hiroshi Teshigahara	Japan	
426	The Ice Storm	1997	Ang Lee	United States	
427	Death of a Cyclist	1955	Juan Antonio Bardem	Spain	
428	Blast of Silence	1961	Allen Baron	United States	
429	The Lovers	1958	Louis Malle	France	
430	The Fire Within	1963	Louis Malle	France	
431	The Thief of Bagdad	1940	Ludwig Berger, Michael Powell, Tim Whelan	United Kingdom	
432	Mishima: A Life in Four Chapters	1985	Paul Schrader	United States	
433	Patriotism	1966	Yukio Mishima, Domoto Masaki	Japan	
434	Classe Tous Risques	1960	Claude Sautet	France	
435	The Furies	1950	Anthony Mann	United States	
436	Before the Rain	1994	Milcho Manchevski	Republic of Macedonia	First North Macedonian film in the collection
437	Vampyr	1932	Carl Theodor Dreyer	Denmark	
438	Mon Oncle Antoine	1971	Claude Jutra	Canada	
439	Trafic	1971	Jacques Tati	France	
440	Brand Upon the Brain!	2006	Guy Maddin	Canada	
441	The Small Back Room	1949	Michael Powell, Emeric Pressburger	United Kingdom	
442	Twenty-Four Eyes	1954	Keisuke Kinoshita	Japan	
443 (Note: Released on LaserDisc as Spine #264)	La Ronde^{†}	1950	Max Ophüls	France	
444	Le Plaisir	1952	Max Ophüls	France	
445 (Note: Released on LaserDisc as Spine #302)	The Earrings of Madame de...^{†}	1953	Max Ophüls	France	
446	An Autumn Afternoon	1962	Yasujirō Ozu	Japan	
447	Le Doulos	1962	Jean-Pierre Melville	France	
448	Le Deuxième Souffle	1966	Jean-Pierre Melville	France	
449	Missing	1982	Costa-Gavras	United States	
450	Bottle Rocket	1996	Wes Anderson	United States	
451	Fanfan la Tulipe	1952	Christian-Jaque	France	
452	The Spy Who Came In from the Cold	1965	Martin Ritt	United States	
453 (Note: Released on LaserDisc without a spine number)	Chungking Express^{†}	1994	Wong Kar-wai	Hong Kong	
454	Europa	1991	Lars von Trier	Denmark	
455	White Dog	1982	Samuel Fuller	United States	
456	The Taking of Power by Louis XIV	1966	Roberto Rossellini	Italy	
457	Magnificent Obsession	1954	Douglas Sirk	United States	
458	El Norte	1983	Gregory Nava	Guatemala	First Guatemalan film in the collection
459	The Exterminating Angel	1962	Luis Buñuel	Mexico	
460	Simon of the Desert	1965	Luis Buñuel	Mexico	
461 (Note: Released on LaserDisc as Spine #259)	Hobson's Choice^{†}	1954	David Lean	United Kingdom	
462 (Note: Released on LaserDisc as Spine #158)	The Last Metro^{†}	1980	François Truffaut	France	
463	Il Generale Della Rovere	1959	Roberto Rossellini	Italy	
464	Danton	1983	Andrzej Wajda	France	
465 (Note: Released on LaserDisc as Spine #291)	Dodes'ka-den^{†}	1970	Akira Kurosawa	Japan	
466	In the Realm of the Senses	1976	Nagisa Ōshima	Japan	
467	Empire of Passion	1978	Nagisa Ōshima	Japan	
469	The Hit	1984	Stephen Frears	United Kingdom	
470	Wise Blood	1979	John Huston	United States	
475	The Friends of Eddie Coyle	1973	Peter Yates	United States	
476	The Curious Case of Benjamin Button	2008	David Fincher	United States	
477	Bergman Island	2006	Marie Nyreröd	Sweden	
478	Last Year at Marienbad	1961	Alain Resnais	France	
479	My Dinner with André	1981	Louis Malle	United States	
480	The Human Condition	1959	Masaki Kobayashi	Japan	
481	Made in U.S.A.	1966	Jean-Luc Godard	France	
482	2 or 3 Things I Know About Her	1967	Jean-Luc Godard	France	
483 (Note: Released on LaserDisc as Spine #212)	Repulsion^{†}	1965	Roman Polanski	United Kingdom	
484	Jeanne Dielman, 23 quai du Commerce, 1080 Bruxelles	1975	Chantal Akerman	France	
485	The Last Days of Disco	1998	Whit Stillman	United States	
486	Homicide	1991	David Mamet	United States	
487	That Hamilton Woman	1941	Alexander Korda	United Kingdom	
488	Howards End	1992	James Ivory	United Kingdom	
489	Monsoon Wedding	2001	Mira Nair	India	First Indian film in the collection
490	Wings of Desire	1987	Wim Wenders	Germany	
491	Z	1969	Costa-Gavras	Greece	First Greek film in the collection
492	A Christmas Tale	2008	Arnaud Desplechin	France	
493	Gomorrah	2008	Matteo Garrone	Italy	
494	Downhill Racer	1969	Michael Ritchie	United States	
496	Che	2008	Steven Soderbergh	France	
501	Paris, Texas	1984	Wim Wenders	Germany	
502	Revanche	2008	Götz Spielmann	Austria	First Austrian film in the collection
503 (Note: Released on LaserDisc as Spine #12)	Lola Montès^{†}	1955	Max Ophüls	Germany	
504	Hunger	2008	Steve McQueen	Ireland	First Irish film in the collection
505	Make Way for Tomorrow	1937	Leo McCarey	United States	
506	Dillinger is Dead	1969	Marco Ferreri	Italy	
507	Bigger Than Life	1956	Nicholas Ray	United States	
512 (Note: Released on LaserDisc as Spine #345)	Vivre sa vie^{†}	1962	Jean-Luc Godard	France	
513	Summer Hours	2008	Olivier Assayas	France	
514	Ride with the Devil	1999	Ang Lee	United States	
515	The Fugitive Kind	1960	Sidney Lumet	United States	
516	Stagecoach	1939	John Ford	United States	
519	Close-Up	1990	Abbas Kiarostami	Iran	
520	Everlasting Moments	2008	Jan Troell	Sweden	
521	Mystery Train	1989	Jim Jarmusch	United States	
522	Red Desert	1964	Michelangelo Antonioni	France	
523	Night Train to Munich	1940	Carol Reed	United Kingdom	
527	The Secret of the Grain	2007	Abdellatif Kechiche	France	
532	Louie Bluie	1985	Terry Zwigoff	United States	
533	Crumb	1995	Terry Zwigoff	United States	
534	L'enfance Nue	1968	Maurice Pialat	France	
535	Merry Christmas, Mr. Lawrence	1983	Nagisa Ōshima	United Kingdom	
536	The Thin Red Line	1998	Terrence Malick	United States	
537 (Note: Released on LaserDisc as Spine #303)	The Magician^{†}	1958	Ingmar Bergman	Sweden	
538 (Note: Released on LaserDisc as Spine #57)	Paths of Glory^{†}	1957	Stanley Kubrick	United States	
539	House	1977	Nobuhiko Obayashi	Japan	
540	The Darjeeling Limited	2007	Wes Anderson	United States	
541 (Note: Released on LaserDisc as Spine #28)	The Night of the Hunter^{†}	1955	Charles Laughton	United States	
542	Antichrist	2009	Lars von Trier	Denmark	
543	Modern Times	1936	Charles Chaplin	United States	
544	Head	1968	Bob Rafelson	United States	
545	Easy Rider	1969	Dennis Hopper	United States	
546 (Note: Released on LaserDisc as Spine #81)	Five Easy Pieces^{†}	1970	Bob Rafelson	United States	
547	Drive, He Said	1970	Jack Nicholson	United States	
548	A Safe Place	1971	Henry Jaglom	United States	
549 (Note: Released on LaserDisc as Spine #139)	The Last Picture Show^{†}	1971	Peter Bogdanovich	United States	
550	The King of Marvin Gardens	1972	Bob Rafelson	United States	
551	Cronos	1993	Guillermo Del Toro	Mexico	
552	Broadcast News	1987	James L. Brooks	United States	
553	Fish Tank	2009	Andrea Arnold	United Kingdom	
554	Still Walking	2008	Hirokazu Kore-eda	Japan	
555	Sweet Smell of Success	1957	Alexander Mackendrick	United States	
556	Senso	1954	Luchino Visconti	Italy	
557	The Times of Harvey Milk	1984	Robert Epstein	United States	
558	Topsy-Turvy	1999	Mike Leigh	United Kingdom	
559	The Mikado	1939	Victor Schertzinger	United Kingdom	
560	White Material	2009	Claire Denis	France	
561	Kes	1970	Ken Loach	United Kingdom	
562	Blow Out	1981	Brian De Palma	United States	
563	Something Wild	1986	Jonathan Demme	United States	
564	Pale Flower	1964	Masahiro Shinoda	Japan	
565	The Great Dictator	1940	Charles Chaplin	United States	
566	Insignificance	1985	Nicolas Roeg	United Kingdom	
567 (Note: Released on LaserDisc as Spine #195)	The Makioka Sisters^{†}	1983	Kon Ichikawa	Japan	
568	Kiss Me Deadly	1955	Robert Aldrich	United States	
569	People on Sunday	1930	Robert Siodmak, Edgar G. Ulmer	Germany	
570	Zazie dans le Métro	1960	Louis Malle	France	
571	Black Moon	1975	Louis Malle	France	
572	Léon Morin, Priest	1961	Jean-Pierre Melville	France	
573	The Music Room	1958	Satyajit Ray	India	
574	Life During Wartime	2010	Todd Solondz	United States	
575	The Killing	1956	Stanley Kubrick	United States	
576	Secret Sunshine	2007	Lee Chang-dong	South Korea	First South Korean film in the collection (on DVD)
577	Cul-de-sac	1966	Roman Polanski	United Kingdom	
579	The Phantom Carriage	1921	Victor Sjöström	Sweden	
580	Le Beau Serge	1958	Claude Chabrol	France	
581	Les Cousins	1959	Claude Chabrol	France	
582	Carlos	2010	Olivier Assayas	Germany	
583	The Four Feathers	1939	Zoltan Korda	United Kingdom	
584	Kuroneko	1968	Kaneto Shindo	Japan	
585	Identification of a Woman	1982	Michelangelo Antonioni	Italy	
586	Island of Lost Souls	1932	Erle C. Kenton	United States	
591 (Note: Released on LaserDisc as spine #27)	12 Angry Men^{†}	1957	Sidney Lumet	United States	
592	Design for Living	1933	Ernst Lubitsch	United States	
593 (Note: Released on LaserDisc as spine #290)	Belle de Jour^{†}	1967	Luis Buñuel	France	
594	Godzilla	1954	Ishirō Honda	Japan	
595	The Moment of Truth	1965	Francesco Rosi	Italy	
596	Three Outlaw Samurai	1964	Hideo Gosha	Japan	
597	Tiny Furniture	2010	Lena Dunham	United States	
598	World on a Wire	1973	Rainer Werner Fassbinder	Germany	
599	Vanya on 42nd Street	1994	Louis Malle	United States	
600	Anatomy of a Murder	1959	Otto Preminger	United States	
601	Letter Never Sent	1959	Mikhail Kalatozov	Soviet Union	
602	The War Room	1993	Chris Hegedus, D.A. Pennebaker	United States	
608	Harold and Maude	1971	Hal Ashby	United States	
609	¡Alambrista!	1977	Robert M. Young	United States	
610	The Organizer	1963	Mario Monicelli	Italy	
611	Being John Malkovich	1999	Spike Jonze	United States	
612	Certified Copy	2010	Abbas Kiarostami	Iran	
613	Summer Interlude	1951	Ingmar Bergman	Sweden	
614	Summer with Monika	1953	Ingmar Bergman	Sweden	
615	The Gold Rush	1942	Charles Chaplin	United States	
616	Shallow Grave	1994	Danny Boyle	United Kingdom	
617	And Everything Is Going Fine	2010	Steven Soderbergh	United States	
618	Gray's Anatomy	1997	Steven Soderbergh	United States	
619	Le Havre	2011	Aki Kaurismäki	France	
620	La Promesse	1996	Luc Dardenne, Jean-Pierre Dardenne	Belgium	
621	Rosetta	1999	Luc Dardenne, Jean-Pierre Dardenne	Belgium	
622	Weekend	2011	Andrew Haigh	United Kingdom	
623	Lonesome	1928	Paul Fejos	United States	
624	Quadrophenia	1979	Franc Roddam	United Kingdom	
625	Eating Raoul	1982	Paul Bartel	United States	
626	Les Visiteurs du Soir	1942	Marcel Carné	France	
627 (Note: Released on LaserDisc as Spine #365)	The Game^{†}	1997	David Fincher	United States	
628	The Forgiveness of Blood	2011	Joshua Marston	United States	
629 (Note: Released on LaserDisc as Spine #148)	Sunday Bloody Sunday^{†}	1971	John Schlesinger	United Kingdom	
630	Rosemary's Baby	1968	Roman Polanski	United States	
635	Weekend	1967	Jean-Luc Godard	France	
636	Heaven's Gate	1980	Michael Cimino	United States	
637 (Note: Released on LaserDisc as Spine #324)	Purple Noon^{†}	1960	René Clément	France	
638	Following	1999	Christopher Nolan	United Kingdom	
643	The Man Who Knew Too Much	1934	Alfred Hitchcock	United Kingdom	
644	Pina	2011	Wim Wenders	Germany	
645	The Ballad of Narayama	1958	Keisuke Kinoshita	Japan	
646	The Kid with a Bike	2011	Luc Dardenne, Jean-Pierre Dardenne	Belgium	
647	On the Waterfront	1954	Elia Kazan	United States	
648	Chronicle of a Summer	1961	Jean Rouch, Edgar Morin	France	
649	Ministry of Fear	1944	Fritz Lang	United States	
650	A Man Escaped	1956	Robert Bresson	France	
651	Badlands	1973	Terrence Malick	United States	
652	Monsieur Verdoux	1947	Charles Chaplin	United States	
653	Gate of Hell	1953	Teinosuke Kinugasa	Japan	
654	Repo Man	1984	Alex Cox	United States	
656	Jubal	1956	Delmer Daves	United States	
657	3:10 to Yuma	1957	Delmer Daves	United States	
658	Medium Cool	1969	Haskell Wexler	United States	
659	Life Is Sweet	1990	Mike Leigh	United Kingdom	
660	Things to Come	1936	William Cameron Menzies	United Kingdom	
661	Marketa Lazarová	1967	František Vláčil	Czechoslovakia	
662	Safety Last!	1923	Fred Newmeyer, Sam Taylor	United States	
663	Shoah	1985	Claude Lanzmann	France	
664 (Note: Released on LaserDisc as Spine #329)	The Life of Oharu^{†}	1952	Kenji Mizoguchi	Japan	
665	Babette's Feast	1987	Gabriel Axel	Denmark	
666	The Devil's Backbone	2001	Guillermo Del Toro	Mexico	
667	Seconds	1966	John Frankenheimer	United States	
668	The Big City	1963	Satyajit Ray	India	
669	Charulata	1964	Satyajit Ray	India	
670	To Be or Not to Be	1942	Ernst Lubitsch	United States	
671 (Note: Released on LaserDisc as spine #96)	La Cage aux Folles^{†}	1978	Édouard Molinaro	France	
676	I Married a Witch	1942	René Clair	United States	
677	The Uninvited	1944	Lewis Allen	United States	
678	La Notte	1961	Michelangelo Antonioni	Italy	
680	City Lights	1931	Charles Chaplin	United States	
681	Frances Ha	2013	Noah Baumbach	United States	
682	Investigation of a Citizen Above Suspicion	1970	Elio Petri	Italy	
683	Nashville	1975	Robert Altman	United States	
691	Thief	1981	Michael Mann	United States	
692	It's a Mad, Mad, Mad, Mad World	1963	Stanley Kramer	United States	
693	La Vie de Bohème	1992	Aki Kaurismäki	Finland	First Finnish film in the collection
694	The Long Day Closes	1992	Terence Davies	United Kingdom	
695	Blue Is the Warmest Color	2013	Abdellatif Kechiche	France	
696	Foreign Correspondent	1940	Alfred Hitchcock	United States	
697	Tess	1979	Roman Polanski	United Kingdom	
698	King of the Hill	1993	Steven Soderbergh	United States	
699	A Brief History of Time	1991	Errol Morris	United States	
700	Fantastic Mr. Fox	2009	Wes Anderson	United States	First animated film in the collection (on DVD)
701	Persona	1966	Ingmar Bergman	Sweden	
702	The Great Beauty	2013	Paolo Sorrentino	Italy	
703	The Freshman	1925	Fred Newmeyer, Sam Taylor	United States	
704	Riot in Cell Block 11	1954	Don Siegel	United States	
705 (Note: Released on LaserDisc as spine #343)	Breaking the Waves^{†}	1996	Lars von Trier	Denmark	
706	Master of the House	1925	Carl Theodor Dreyer	Denmark	
707	Il Sorpasso	1962	Dino Risi	Italy	
708	Like Someone in Love	2012	Abbas Kiarostami	Japan	
709	Red River	1948	Howard Hawks	United States	
710	Judex	1963	Georges Franju	France	
711 (Note: Released on LaserDisc as Spine #20)	A Hard Day's Night^{†}	1964	Richard Lester	United Kingdom	
712	Scanners	1981	David Cronenberg	Canada	
720 (Note: Released on LaserDisc as spine #123)	The Big Chill^{†}	1983	Lawrence Kasdan	United States	
721	Love Streams	1984	John Cassavetes	United States	
722	Tie Me Up! Tie Me Down!	1990	Pedro Almodóvar	Spain	
723	Y tu mamá también	2001	Alfonso Cuarón	Mexico	
724	All That Jazz	1979	Bob Fosse	United States	
725	Eraserhead	1977	David Lynch	United States	
726	Macbeth	1971	Roman Polanski	United Kingdom	
727	The Innocents	1961	Jack Clayton	United States	
728	Sundays and Cybèle	1962	Serge Bourguignon	France	
732	My Darling Clementine	1946	John Ford	United States	
733	La Dolce Vita	1960	Federico Fellini	Italy	
736	It Happened One Night	1934	Frank Capra	United States	
738 (Note: Released on LaserDisc as Spine #145)	Tootsie^{†}	1982	Sydney Pollack	United States	
739	Safe	1995	Todd Haynes	United States	
740	The Bitter Tears of Petra von Kant	1972	Rainer Werner Fassbinder	West Germany	First West German film in the collection
741	My Winnipeg	2007	Guy Maddin	Canada	
742	The Palm Beach Story	1942	Preston Sturges	United States	
743	La Ciénaga	2001	Lucrecia Martel	Argentina	First Argentinian film in the collection
744	Every Man for Himself	1980	Jean-Luc Godard	France	
745	Don't Look Now	1973	Nicolas Roeg	United Kingdom	
746	A Day in the Country	1936	Jean Renoir	France	
747 (Note: Released on LaserDisc as Spine #35 and Spine #230 for CAV and CLV respectively)	Fellini Satyricon^{†}	1969	Federico Fellini	Italy	
748	Watership Down	1978	Martin Rosen	United Kingdom	
749 (Note: Released on LaserDisc as Spine #243)	The Soft Skin^{†}	1964	François Truffaut	France	
750	Ride the Pink Horse	1947	Robert Montgomery	United States	
753	The Thin Blue Line	1988	Errol Morris	United States	
754 (Note: Released on LaserDisc as Spine #280)	Odd Man Out^{†}	1947	Carol Reed	United Kingdom	
755	Le Silence de la Mer	1949	Jean-Pierre Melville	France	
756	Limelight	1952	Charles Chaplin	United States	
757	The Rose	1979	Mark Rydell	United States	
758	The Merchant of Four Seasons	1971	Rainer Werner Fassbinder	Germany	
759	The Confession	1970	Costa-Gavras	Italy	
760	State of Siege	1972	Costa-Gavras	France	
761	Valerie and Her Week of Wonders	1970	Jaromil Jireš	Czechoslovakia	
762	A Master Builder	2014	Jonathan Demme	United States	
763	The Bridge	1959	Bernhard Wicki	Germany	
764 (Note: Released on LaserDisc as Spine #149)	The Fisher King^{†}	1991	Terry Gilliam	United States	
765	The Black Stallion	1979	Carroll Ballard	United States	
766	Here Is Your Life	1966	Jan Troell	Sweden	
767	My Beautiful Laundrette	1985	Stephen Frears	United Kingdom	
768	The French Lieutenant's Woman	1981	Karel Reisz	United Kingdom	
769	Day for Night	1973	François Truffaut	France	
770	Dressed To Kill	1980	Brian De Palma	United States	
771	Two Days, One Night	2014	Luc Dardenne, Jean-Pierre Dardenne	Belgium	
772	Blind Chance	1981	Krzysztof Kieślowski	Poland	
773 (Note: Released on LaserDisc as spine #355)	Breaker Morant^{†}	1980	Bruce Beresford	Australia	
774	Mister Johnson	1990	Bruce Beresford	United States	
775	A Room with a View	1986	James Ivory	United Kingdom	
776	Moonrise Kingdom	2012	Wes Anderson	United States	
777	The Brood	1979	David Cronenberg	Canada	
778	A Special Day	1977	Ettore Scola	Italy	
779	Mulholland Drive	2001	David Lynch	United States	
780	Code Unknown	2000	Michael Haneke	France	
781	In Cold Blood	1967	Richard Brooks	United States	
786	Don't Look Back	1967	D.A. Pennebaker	United States	
787	Jellyfish Eyes	2013	Takashi Murakami	Japan	
788	Speedy	1928	Ted Wilde	United States	
789	Burroughs: The Movie	1983	Howard Brookner	United States	
792	Bitter Rice	1949	Giuseppe De Santis	Italy	
793	The American Friend	1977	Wim Wenders	Germany	
795	Inside Llewyn Davis	2013	Joel Coen, Ethan Coen	United States	
795	Gilda	1946	Charles Vidor	United States	
798	Death by Hanging	1968	Nagisa Ōshima	Japan	
799	The Kid	1921	Charles Chaplin	United States	
800 (Note: Released on LaserDisc as Spine #17 and Spine #68 for CAV and CLV respectively)	The Graduate^{†}	1967	Mike Nichols	United States	
801	I Knew Her Well	1965	Antonio Pietrangeli	Italy	
802	Paris Belongs to Us	1961	Jacques Rivette	France	
803	The Manchurian Candidate	1962	John Frankenheimer	United States	
804	A Brighter Summer Day	1991	Edward Yang	Taiwan	
805	A Poem Is a Naked Person	1974	Les Blank	United States	
806	Only Angels Have Wings	1939	Howard Hawks	United States	
807	Barcelona	1994	Whit Stillman	United States	
809	Phoenix	2014	Christian Petzold	Germany	
810	In a Lonely Place	1950	Nicholas Ray	United States	
811	The Naked Island	1960	Kaneto Shindo	Japan	
812 (Note: Released on LaserDisc as Spine #175)	The Player^{†}	1992	Robert Altman	United States	
817	Le Amiche	1955	Michelangelo Antonioni	Italy	
818	La Chienne	1931	Jean Renoir	France	
819 (Note: Released on LaserDisc as Spine #135)	Here Comes Mr. Jordan^{†}	1941	Alexander Hall	United States	
820	Fantastic Planet	1973	René Laloux	France	
821 (Note: Released on LaserDisc as Spine #143)	Dr. Strangelove, or: How I Learned to Stop Worrying and Love the Bomb^{†}	1964	Stanley Kubrick	United States	
822	Clouds of Sils Maria	2014	Olivier Assayas	France	
823	The In-Laws	1979	Arthur Hiller	United States	
824	Muriel, or The Time of Return	1963	Alain Resnais	France	
825	A Touch of Zen	1971	King Hu	Taiwan	First Taiwanese film in the collection
826	The New World	2005	Terrence Malick	United States	
827	McCabe & Mrs. Miller	1971	Robert Altman	United States	
828	Ingrid Bergman: In Her Own Words	2015	Stig Björkman	Sweden	
829	A Taste of Honey	1961	Tony Richardson	United Kingdom	
830	Chimes at Midnight	1966	Orson Welles	Spain	
831	The Immortal Story	1968	Orson Welles	France	
832	The Story of the Last Chrysanthemums	1939	Kenji Mizoguchi	Japan	
833 (Note: Released on LaserDisc as Spine #233)	Cat People^{†}	1942	Jacques Tourneur	United States	
834	Blood Simple	1984	Joel Coen	United States	
835	Valley of the Dolls	1967	Mark Robson	United States	
836	Beyond the Valley of the Dolls	1970	Russ Meyer	United States	
837	Dekalog	1988	Krzysztof Kieślowski	Poland	
838	Pan's Labyrinth	2006	Guillermo Del Toro	Spain	
839	Boyhood	2014	Richard Linklater	United States	
840	The Executioner	1963	Luis García Berlanga	Spain	
842	Dreams	1990	Akira Kurosawa	Japan	
843	Punch-Drunk Love	2002	Paul Thomas Anderson	United States	
844	One-Eyed Jacks	1961	Marlon Brando	United States	
845	The Squid and the Whale	2005	Noah Baumbach	United States	
846	Heart of a Dog	2015	Laurie Anderson	United States	
847 (Note: Released on LaserDisc as spine #26)	The Asphalt Jungle^{†}	1950	John Huston	United States	
848	Roma	1972	Federico Fellini	Italy	
849	His Girl Friday	1940	Howard Hawks	United States	
850	Something Wild	1961	Jack Garfein	United States	
851	Fox and His Friends	1975	Rainer Werner Fassbinder	Germany	
852	Black Girl	1966	Ousmane Sembène	Senegal	
853	Cameraperson	2016	Kirsten Johnson	United States	
854	The Tree of Wooden Clogs	1978	Ermanno Olmi	Italy	
855 (Note: Released on LaserDisc as Spine #348)	Women on the Verge of a Nervous Breakdown^{†}	1988	Pedro Almodóvar	Spain	
860	Mildred Pierce	1945	Michael Curtiz	United States	
861	45 Years	2015	Andrew Haigh	United Kingdom	
862	Canoa: A Shameful Memory	1976	Felipe Cazals	Mexico	
863	Multiple Maniacs	1970	John Waters	United States	
864	Being There	1979	Hal Ashby	United States	
865 (Note: Released on LaserDisc as spine #48)	Blow-Up^{†}	1966	Michelangelo Antonioni	United Kingdom	
866	Buena Vista Social Club	1999	Wim Wenders	United States	
867	Woman of the Year	1942	George Stevens	United States	
868	Tampopo	1985	Juzo Itami	Japan	
869	Rumble Fish	1983	Francis Ford Coppola	United States	
870 (Note: Released on LaserDisc as Spine #220)	Othello^{†}	1952	Orson Welles	United States	
871	Dheepan	2015	Jacques Audiard	France	
872	Ghost World	2001	Terry Zwigoff	United States	
880	They Live by Night	1948	Nicholas Ray	United States	
885	The Lodger: A Story of the London Fog	1927	Alfred Hitchcock	United Kingdom	
886	L'argent	1983	Robert Bresson	France	
887	Lost in America	1985	Albert Brooks	United States	
888	Stalker	1979	Andrei Tarkovsky	Soviet Union	
889	The Breaking Point	1950	Michael Curtiz	United States	
890	Meantime	1984	Mike Leigh	United Kingdom	
891	La Poison	1951	Sacha Guitry	France	
892	Festival	1967	Murray Lerner	United States	
893	Certain Women	2016	Kelly Reichardt	United States	
894	The Piano Teacher	2001	Michael Haneke	France	
895	David Lynch: The Art Life	2016	Jon Nguyen, Rick Barnes, Olivia Neergaard-Holm	United States	
896	The Lure	2015	Agnieszka Smoczyńska	Poland	
897	Barry Lyndon	1975	Stanley Kubrick	United States	
898	Twin Peaks: Fire Walk with Me	1992	David Lynch	United States	
899	Personal Shopper	2016	Olivier Assayas	France	
901	The Philadelphia Story	1940	George Cukor	United States	
902	Desert Hearts	1985	Donna Deitch	United States	
903	Jabberwocky	1977	Terry Gilliam	United Kingdom	
904	Election	1999	Alexander Payne	United States	
905	The Breakfast Club	1985	John Hughes	United States	
906	I, Daniel Blake	2016	Ken Loach	United Kingdom	
907	Westfront 1918	1930	G.W. Pabst	Germany	
908	Kameradschaft	1931	G.W. Pabst	Germany	
909	Night of the Living Dead	1968	George A. Romero	United States	
910	Tom Jones	1963	Tony Richardson	United Kingdom	
911	The Hero	1966	Satyajit Ray	India	
912	An Actor's Revenge	1963	Kon Ichikawa	Japan	
913	The Age of Innocence	1993	Martin Scorsese	United States	
914	Baal	1970	Volker Schlöndorff	West Germany	
915	King of Jazz	1930	John Murray Anderson	United States	
916	Women in Love	1969	Ken Russell	United Kingdom	
917	The Awful Truth	1937	Leo McCarey	United States	
918	The Color of Pomegranates	1969	Sergei Parajanov	Soviet Union	
919	Dead Man	1995	Jim Jarmusch	United States	
920	The Virgin Suicides	1999	Sofia Coppola	United States	
921	Moonrise	1948	Frank Borzage	United States	
922	The Other Side of Hope	2017	Aki Kaurismäki	Finland	
923	Beyond the Hills	2012	Cristian Mungiu	Romania	First Romanian film in the collection
924	Graduation	2016	Cristian Mungiu	Romania	
925 (Note: Released on LaserDisc as Spine #146)	Midnight Cowboy^{†}	1969	John Schlesinger	United States	
926	Manila in the Claws of Light	1975	Lino Brocka	Philippines	
927	El Sur	1983	Víctor Erice	Spain	
928	Bowling for Columbine	2002	Michael Moore	United States	
929	Female Trouble	1974	John Waters	United States	
936	Bull Durham	1988	Ron Shelton	United States	
937	Dragon Inn	1967	King Hu	Taiwan	
938 (Note: Released on LaserDisc as Spine #108)	Sex, Lies, and Videotape^{†}	1989	Steven Soderbergh	United States	
939	A Matter of Life and Death	1946	Michael Powell, Emeric Pressburger	United Kingdom	
940	The Ballad of Gregorio Cortez	1982	Robert M. Young	United States	
941	Smithereens	1982	Susan Seidelman	United States	
942	The Tree of Life	2011	Terrence Malick	United States	
943	Memories of Underdevelopment	1968	Tomás Gutiérrez Alea	Cuba	First Cuban film in the collection
944	Cold Water	1994	Olivier Assayas	France	
945	A Raisin in the Sun	1961	Daniel Petrie	United States	
946	Eight Hours Don't Make a Day	1972	Rainer Werner Fassbinder	Germany	
947 (Note: Released on LaserDisc as Spine #79)	Shampoo^{†}	1975	Hal Ashby	United States	
948 (Note: Released on LaserDisc as Spine #40, later reissued as Spine #320)	The Princess Bride^{†}	1987	Rob Reiner	United States	
949	A Story from Chikamatsu	1954	Kenji Mizoguchi	Japan	
950 (Note: Released on LaserDisc as Spine #74)	Some Like It Hot^{†}	1959	Billy Wilder	United States	
951	True Stories	1986	David Byrne	United States	
952 (Note: Released on LaserDisc as Spine #9)	The Magnificent Ambersons^{†}	1942	Orson Welles	United States	
953	A Dry White Season	1989	Euzhan Palcy	United States	
954	Forty Guns	1957	Samuel Fuller	United States	
955	Panique	1946	Julien Duvivier	France	
956	24 Frames	2017	Abbas Kiarostami	Iran	
957	Mikey and Nicky	1976	Elaine May	United States	
958	4 Months, 3 Weeks and 2 Days	2007	Cristian Mungiu	Romania	
959	In the Heat of the Night	1967	Norman Jewison	United States	
960	La Vérité	1960	Henri-Georges Clouzot	France	
961	Shame	1968	Ingmar Bergman	Sweden	
962	Death in Venice	1971	Luchino Visconti	Italy	
963	To Sleep with Anger	1990	Charles Burnett	United States	
964	The Kid Brother	1927	Ted Wilde	United States	
965	Wanda	1970	Barbara Loden	United States	
966	Detour	1945	Edgar G. Ulmer	United States	
967	I Wanna Hold Your Hand	1978	Robert Zemeckis	United States	
968	Japón	2002	Carlos Reygadas	Mexico	
969	Diamonds of the Night	1964	Jan Němec	Czechoslovakia	
970	A Face in the Crowd	1957	Elia Kazan	United States	
973	My Brilliant Career	1979	Gillian Armstrong	Australia	
974	The Heiress	1949	William Wyler	United States	
975	Funny Games	1997	Michael Haneke	Austria	
976	Let the Sunshine In	2017	Claire Denis	France	
977	Blue Velvet	1986	David Lynch	United States	
978	One Sings, the Other Doesn't	1977	Agnès Varda	France	
979 (Note: Released on LaserDisc as Spine #6)	Swing Time^{†}	1936	George Stevens	United States	
980	La Vie de Jesus	1997	Bruno Dumont	France	
981	L'humanité	1999	Bruno Dumont	France	
982	Hedwig and the Angry Inch	2001	John Cameron Mitchell	United States	
983	War and Peace	1966	Sergei Bondarchuk	Soviet Union	
984	1984	1984	Michael Radford	United Kingdom	
985	Europa Europa	1990	Agnieszka Holland	Poland	
986	The Baker's Wife	1938	Marcel Pagnol	France	
987	Klute	1971	Alan J. Pakula	United States	
988	The Inland Sea	1991	Lucille Carra	United States	
989	The Flavor of Green Tea over Rice	1952	Yasujirō Ozu	Japan	
993	The Cloud-Capped Star	1960	Ritwik Ghatak	India	
994	Local Hero	1983	Bill Forsyth	United Kingdom	
995 (Note: Released on LaserDisc as Spine #210)	Polyester^{†}	1981	John Waters	United States	
996	The Circus	1928	Charles Chaplin	United States	
997	Cluny Brown	1946	Ernst Lubitsch	United States	
998	When We Were Kings	1996	Leon Gast	United States	
999	Matewan	1987	John Sayles	United States	
1001	The Daytrippers	1996	Greg Mottola	Canada	
1002	Betty Blue	1986	Jean-Jacques Beineix	France	
1003	All About Eve	1950	Joseph L. Mankiewicz	United States	
1004	Now, Voyager	1942	Irving Rapper	United States	
1005	Cold War	2018	Paweł Pawlikowski	Poland	
1006	The Story of Temple Drake	1933	Stephen Roberts	United States	
1007	Until the End of the World	1991	Wim Wenders	Germany	
1008	Old Joy	2006	Kelly Reichardt	United States	
1009	Holiday	1938	George Cukor	United States	
1010	Le Petit Soldat	1963	Jean-Luc Godard	France	
1011	Fail Safe	1964	Sidney Lumet	United States	
1012	All About My Mother	1999	Pedro Almodóvar	Spain	
1013	Teorema	1968	Pier Paolo Pasolini	Italy	
1014	Roma	2018	Alfonso Cuarón	United States	
1018	Paris Is Burning	1990	Jennie Livingston	United States	
1019	Bamboozled	2000	Spike Lee	United States	
1020	Leave Her to Heaven	1945	John M. Stahl	United States	
1021 (Note: Released on LaserDisc as Spine #44)	Show Boat^{†}	1936	James Whale	United States	
1022 (Note: Released on LaserDisc as Spine #227)	The Prince of Tides^{†}	1991	Barbra Streisand	United States	
1023	The Cremator	1969	Juraj Herz	Czechoslovakia	
1024	Destry Rides Again	1939	George Marshall	United States	
1025	The Grand Budapest Hotel	2014	Wes Anderson	United States	
1026	Me and You and Everyone We Know	2005	Miranda July	United States	
1027 (Note: Released on LaserDisc as Spine #95)	The Great Escape^{†}	1963	John Sturges	United States	
1028	Dance, Girl, Dance	1940	Dorothy Arzner	United States	
1029	Husbands	1970	John Cassavetes	United States	
1031	Wildlife	2018	Paul Dano	United States	
1032	An Unmarried Woman	1978	Paul Mazursky	United States	
1033	The Cameraman	1928	Edward Sedgwick	United States	
1034	Portrait of a Lady on Fire	2019	Céline Sciamma	France	
1035	Come and See	1985	Elem Klimov	Soviet Union	
1037	The War of the Worlds	1953	Byron Haskin	United States	
1038	Marriage Story	2019	Noah Baumbach	United States	
1039	Town Bloody Hall	1979	Chris Hegedus, D.A. Pennebaker	United States	
1040	Toni	1935	Jean Renoir	France	
1041	The Comfort of Strangers	1990	Paul Schrader	Italy	
1042	Beau Travail	1999	Claire Denis	France	
1043	Christ Stopped at Eboli	1979	Francesco Rosi	Italy	
1051	The Elephant Man	1980	David Lynch	United Kingdom	
1052	Claudine	1974	John Berry	United States	
1053	The Gunfighter	1950	Henry King	United States	
1054	Parasite	2019	Bong Joon Ho	South Korea	
1055	Girlfriends	1978	Claudia Weill	United States	
1056	Moonstruck	1987	Norman Jewison	United States	
1057	Ghost Dog: The Way of the Samurai	1999	Jim Jarmusch	United States	
1058	The Irishman	2019	Martin Scorsese	United States	
1059 (Note: Released on LaserDisc as Spine #349)	Crash^{†}	1996	David Cronenberg	Canada	
1060	Amores perros	2000	Alejandro González Iñárritu	Mexico	
1061	Minding the Gap	2018	Bing Liu	United States	
1062	Rolling Thunder Revue: A Bob Dylan Story by Martin Scorsese	2019	Martin Scorsese	United States	
1063	The Ascent	1977	Larisa Shepitko	Soviet Union	
1064	The Parallax View	1974	Alan J. Pakula	United States	
1065	Mandabi	1968	Ousmane Sembène	Senegal	
1066	Man Push Cart	2005	Ramin Bahrani	United States	
1067	Chop Shop	2007	Ramin Bahrani	United States	
1068	Smooth Talk	1985	Joyce Chopra	United States	
1069	Céline and Julie Go Boating	1974	Jacques Rivette	France	
1070	Secrets & Lies	1996	Mike Leigh	United Kingdom	
1071	Defending Your Life	1991	Albert Brooks	United States	
1072	History Is Made at Night	1937	Frank Borzage	United States	
1073	Memories of Murder	2003	Bong Joon Ho	South Korea	
1074	Irma Vep	1996	Olivier Assayas	France	
1075	Fast Times at Ridgemont High	1982	Amy Heckerling	United States	
1076	Merrily We Go to Hell	1932	Dorothy Arzner	United States	
1077	Flowers of Shanghai	1998	Hou Hsiao-hsien	Taiwan	
1078	Nightmare Alley	1947	Edmund Goulding	United States	
1081	Visions of Eight	1973	Yuri Ozerov, Mai Zetterling, Arthur Penn, Michael Pfleghar, Kon Ichikawa, Miloš Forman, Claude Lelouch, John Schlesinger	United States	
1083	Pariah	2011	Dee Rees	United States	
1084	Mirror	1975	Andrei Tarkovsky	Soviet Union	
1085	Bringing Up Baby	1938	Howard Hawks	United States	
1086	Deep Cover	1992	Bill Duke	United States	
1087	Working Girls	1986	Lizzie Borden	United States	
1088	La Piscine	1969	Jacques Deray	France	
1089	After Life	1998	Hirokazu Kore-eda	Japan	
1090	Original Cast Album: "Company"	1970	D.A. Pennebaker	United States	
1091	Beasts of No Nation	2015	Cary Joji Fukunaga	United States	
1092	Throw Down	2004	Johnnie To	Hong Kong	
1093	The Story of a Three Day Pass	1967	Melvin Van Peebles	France	
1094	Watermelon Man	1970	Melvin Van Peebles	United States	
1095 (Note: Released on LaserDisc as Spine #316)	Sweet Sweetback's Baadassss Song^{†}	1971	Melvin Van Peebles	United States	
1096	Don't Play Us Cheap	1972	Melvin Van Peebles	United States	
1097	Love & Basketball	2000	Gina Prince-Bythewood	United States	
1098	The Damned	1969	Luchino Visconti	Italy	
1099	High Sierra	1941	Raoul Walsh	United States	
1100	The Incredible Shrinking Man	1957	Jack Arnold	United States	
1101	Uncut Gems	2019	Josh Safdie, Benny Safdie	United States	
1102	Devi	1960	Satyajit Ray	India	
1104 (Note: Released on LaserDisc as Spine #1)	Citizen Kane^{†}	1941	Orson Welles	United States	
1105 (Note: Released on LaserDisc as Spine #219)	Menace II Society^{†}	1993	Albert Hughes, Allen Hughes	United States	
1106	One Night in Miami...	2020	Regina King	United States	
1107	The Learning Tree	1969	Gordon Parks	United States	
1108	The Celebration	1998	Thomas Vinterberg	Denmark	
1109	Time	2020	Garrett Bradley	United States	
1110	The Piano	1993	Jane Campion	New Zealand	
1111	Dick Johnson Is Dead	2020	Kirsten Johnson	United States	
1112	Miller's Crossing	1990	Joel Coen	United States	
1113	Boat People	1982	Ann Hui	Hong Kong	
1114	Love Affair	1939	Leo McCarey	United States	
1115	Adoption	1975	Márta Mészáros	Hungary	First Hungarian film in collection
1116	The Flight of the Phoenix	1965	Robert Altman	United States	
1117	Love Jones	1997	Theodore Witcher	United States	
1118	The Last Waltz	1978	Martin Scorsese	United States	
1119 (Note: Released on LaserDisc as Spine #83)	Miracle in Milan^{†}	1951	Vittorio De Sica	Italy	
1120	The Girl Can't Help It	1956	Frank Tashlin	United States	
1121	Eyimofe (This Is My Desire)	2020	Arie Esiri, Chuko Esiri	Nigeria	First Nigerian film in the collection
1122	'Round Midnight	1986	Bertrand Tavernier	United States	
1123	Mr. Klein	1976	Joseph Losey	France	
1124	Chan Is Missing	1982	Wayne Wang	United States	
1125	The Funeral	1984	Juzo Itami	Japan	
1126	Double Indemnity	1944	Billy Wilder	United States	
1127	Mississippi Masala	1991	Mira Nair	United States	
1128	Farewell Amor	2020	Ekwa Msangi	United States	
1129	Rouge	1987	Stanley Kwan	Hong Kong	
1130	Shaft	1971	Gordon Parks	United States	
1131 (Note: Released on LaserDisc as Spine #341)	Pink Flamingos^{†}	1971	John Waters	United States	
1132	The Worst Person in the World	2021	Joachim Trier	Norway	
1133	Okja	2017	Bong Joon Ho	South Korea	
1134 (Note: Released on LaserDisc as Spine #120)	Raging Bull^{†}	1980	Martin Scorsese	United States	
1135	Devil in a Blue Dress	1995	Carl Franklin	United States	
1136	Drive My Car	2021	Ryusuke Hamaguchi	Japan	
1137	Frownland	2007	Ronald Bronstein	United States	
1138	Daddy Longlegs	2009	Josh Safdie, Benny Safdie	United States	
1139	Hôtel du Nord	1938	Marcel Carné	France	
1140	Buck and the Preacher	1972	Sidney Poitier	United States	
1141	Faya Dayi	2021	Jessica Beshir	Ethiopia	First Ethiopian film in the collection
1149	Take Out	2004	Shih-Ching Tsou, Sean Baker	United States	
1150	Exotica	1994	Atom Egoyan	Canada	
1151	Sound of Metal	2019	Darius Marder	United States	
1152	Lost Highway	1997	David Lynch	United States	
1153 (Note: Released on LaserDisc as spine #136)	Arsenic and Old Lace^{†}	1944	Frank Capra	United States	
1154	Eve's Bayou	1997	Kasi Lemmons	United States	
1155	Cure	1997	Kiyoshi Kurosawa	Japan	
1156	La Llorona	2019	Jayro Bustamante	Guatemala	
1157	Daisies	1966	Věra Chytilová	Czechoslovakia	
1158	The Power of the Dog	2021	Jane Campion	United States	
1160	Malcolm X	1992	Spike Lee	United States	
1161	WALL-E	2008	Andrew Stanton	United States	
1164	The Velvet Underground	2021	Todd Haynes	United States	
1165	Cooley High	1975	Michael Schultz	United States	
1166 (Note: Released on LaserDisc as spine #144)	The Adventures of Baron Munchausen^{†}	1988	Terry Gilliam	United Kingdom	
1167	Imitation of Life	1934	John M. Stahl	United States	
1169	This Is Not a Burial, It's a Resurrection	2019	Lemohang Jeremiah Mosese	Lesotho	First film in the collection from Lesotho
1170	Bergman Island	2021	Mia Hansen-Løve	France	
1171	Romeo and Juliet	1968	Franco Zeffirelli	Italy	
1173	Hollywood Shuffle	1987	Robert Townsend	United States	
1174	Last Hurrah for Chivalry	1979	John Woo	Hong Kong	
1175	Inland Empire	2006	David Lynch	United States	
1176	Chilly Scenes of Winter	1979	Joan Micklin Silver	United States	
1178	Triangle of Sadness	2022	Ruben Östlund	Sweden	
1179	Targets	1968	Peter Bogdanovich	United States	
1180	Thelma & Louise	1991	Ridley Scott	United States	
1181	Petite Maman	2021	Céline Sciamma	France	
1182	The Servant	1963	Joseph Losey	United Kingdom	
1183	Medicine for Melancholy	2008	Barry Jenkins	United States	
1184	The Watermelon Woman	1996	Cheryl Dunye	United States	
1185	After Hours	1985	Martin Scorsese	United States	
1187	One False Move	1992	Carl Franklin	United States	
1188	Dim Sum: A Little Bit of Heart	1985	Wayne Wang	United States	
1190	Drylongso	1998	Cauleen Smith	United States	
1191	The Trial	1962	Orson Welles	France	
1192	Moonage Daydream	2022	Brett Morgen	United States	
1193	La Bamba	1987	Luis Valdez	United States	
1195	The Others	2001	Alejandro Amenábar	Spain	
1196	Nanny	2022	Nikyatu Jusu	United States	
1198	Mean Streets	1973	Martin Scorsese	United States	
1199	La Cérémonie	1995	Claude Chabrol	France	
1201	Guillermo del Toro's Pinocchio	2022	Guillermo Del Toro, Mark Gustafson	Mexico	
1202	Lone Star	1996	John Sayles	United States	
1204 (Note: Released on LaserDisc as Spine #325)	Trainspotting^{†}	1996	Danny Boyle	United Kingdom	
1205	Mudbound	2017	Dee Rees	United States	
1208	The Roaring Twenties	1939	Raoul Walsh	United States	
1209	Nothing but a Man	1964	Michael Roemer	United States	
1210	All the Beauty and the Bloodshed	2022	Laura Poitras	United States	
1211	The Runner	1984	Amir Naderi	Iran	
1212	Saint Omer	2022	Alice Diop	France	
1213	To Die For	1995	Gus Van Sant	United States	
1214 (Note: Released on LaserDisc as Spine #295)	I Am Cuba^{†}	1964	Mikhail Kalatozov	Cuba	
1215	Werckmeister Harmonies	2000	Béla Tarr, Ágnes Hranitzky	Hungary	
1216	Dogfight	1991	Nancy Savoca	United States	
1218	Anatomy of a Fall	2023	Justine Triet	France	
1219	Girlfight	2000	Karyn Kusama	United States	
1220	Bound	1996	Lilly Wachowski, Lilly Wachowski	United States	
1221	Querelle	1982	Rainer Werner Fassbinder	Germany	
1222	Victims of Sin	1951	Emilio Fernández	Mexico	
1223	The Underground Railroad	2021	Barry Jenkins	United States	
1224	Pat Garrett and Billy the Kid	1973	Sam Peckinpah	United States	
1225	Black God, White Devil	1964	Glauber Rocha	Brazil	
1226	Perfect Days	2023	Wim Wenders	Japan	
1227	Risky Business	1983	Paul Brickman	United States	
1228	Farewell My Concubine	1993	Chen Kaige	China	
1230	Not a Pretty Picture	1975	Martha Coolidge	United States	
1231	Real Life	1979	Albert Brooks	United States	
1232	Mother	1996	Albert Brooks	United States	
1234	All of Us Strangers	2023	Andrew Haigh	United Kingdom	
1235	Happiness	1998	Todd Solondz	United States	
1237	Demon Pond	1979	Masahiro Shinoda	Japan	
1238	Gummo	1997	Harmony Korine	United States	
1239	Scarface	1932	Howard Hawks	United States	
1240	Funny Girl	1968	William Wyler	United States	
1241	Paper Moon	1973	Peter Bogdanovich	United States	
1242	The Shape of Water	2017	Guillermo Del Toro	United States	
1243	No Country for Old Men	2007	Joel Coen, Ethan Coen	United States	
1244	Eastern Condors	1987	Sammo Hung	Hong Kong	
1245	The Mother and the Whore	1973	Jean Eustache	France	
1246	The Grifters	1990	Stephen Frears	United States	
1247	Jo Jo Dancer, Your Life Is Calling	1986	Richard Pryor	United States	
1248	Winchester '73	1950	Anthony Mann	United States	
1249	King Lear	1987	Jean-Luc Godard	United States	
1250	Crossing Delancey	1988	Joan Micklin Silver	United States	
1251	Drugstore Cowboy	1989	Gus Van Sant	United States	
1252	Performance	1970	Donald Cammell, Nicolas Roeg	United Kingdom	
1253	A Woman of Paris	1923	Charles Chaplin	United States	
1254	Godzilla vs. Biollante	1989	Kazuki Ōmori	Japan	
1255	Night Moves	1975	Arthur Penn	United States	
1256	Choose Me	1984	Alan Rudolph	United States	
1258	Prince of Broadway	2008	Sean Baker	United States	
1259	Anora	2024	Sean Baker	United States	
1260	Basquiat	1996	Julian Schnabel	United States	
1261	The Wind Will Carry Us	1999	Abbas Kiarostami	Iran	
1262	Killer of Sheep	1977	Charles Burnett	United States	
1264	The Wiz	1978	Sidney Lumet	United States	
1265	Thelonious Monk Straight, No Chaser	1988	Charlotte Zwerin	United States	
1266	Midnight	1939	Mitchell Leisen	United States	
1267	Sorcerer	1977	William Friedkin	United States	
1268	Thirty Two Short Films About Glenn Gould	1993	François Girard	Canada	
1269	The Big Heat	1953	Fritz Lang	United States	
1270 (Note: Released on LaserDisc as spine #140)	Carnal Knowledge^{†}	1971	Mike Nichols	United States	
1271	You Can Count on Me	2000	Kenneth Lonergan	United States	
1272	Shoeshine	1946	Vittorio De Sica	Italy	
1273	Cairo Station	1958	Youssef Chahine	Egypt	First Egyptian film in the collection
1274	Compensation	1999	Zeinabu Irene Davis	United States	
1276	Saving Face	2004	Alice Wu	United States	
1277	Born in Flames	1983	Lizzie Borden	United States	
1278	Flow	2024	Gints Zilbalodis	Latvia	First Latvian film in the collection
1279	Read My Lips	2001	Jacques Audiard	France	
1280	The Beat That My Heart Skipped	2005	Jacques Audiard	France	
1281	Isle of Dogs	2018	Wes Anderson	United States	
1282	The French Dispatch of the Liberty, Kansas Evening Sun	2021	Wes Anderson	United States	
1283	A History of Violence	2005	David Cronenberg	United States	
1284	Altered States	1980	Ken Russell	United States	
1285	Deep Crimson	1996	Arturo Ripstein	Mexico	
1286	Nightmare Alley	2021	Guillermo Del Toro	United States	
1287	House Party	1990	Reginald Hudlin	United States	
1288	Hell's Angels	1930	Howard Hughes	United States	
1289	Él	1953	Luis Buñuel	Mexico	
1290	Eyes Wide Shut	1999	Stanley Kubrick	United Kingdom	
1292	Salaam Bombay!	1988	Mira Nair	India	
1293	Pee-Wee's Big Adventure	1985	Tim Burton	United States	
1294	David Byrne's American Utopia	2020	Spike Lee	United States	
1295	The Dead	1987	John Huston	United Kingdom	
1297	Captain Blood	1935	Michael Curtiz	United States	
1298	Birth	2004	Jonathan Glazer	United States	
1299	Kiss of the Spider Woman	1985	Héctor Babenco	United States	
1300	Network	1976	Sidney Lumet	United States	
1301	The Man Who Wasn't There	2001	Joel Coen	United States	
1302	Killers of the Flower Moon	2023	Martin Scorsese	United States	
1303	Testament	1983	Lynne Littman	United States	
1304	A Man and a Woman	1966	Claude Lelouch	France	
1305	The Blade	1995	Tsui Hark	Hong Kong	
1306	Point Blank	1967	John Boorman	United States	
1308	Body Heat	1981	Lawrence Kasdan	United States	
1309	The Delta	1996	Ira Sachs	United States	
1310	Fresh Kill	1994	Shu Lea Cheang	United Kingdom	
1311	Sentimental Value	2025	Joachim Trier	Norway	
1312	Lenny	1974	Bob Fosse	United States	
1313	West Indies: The Fugitive Slaves of Liberty	1979	Med Hondo	France	
1314	High Art	1998	Lisa Cholodenko	United States	
1315	Hairspray	1988	John Waters	United States	
1316	Desperate Living	1977	John Waters	United States	
1317	It Was Just An Accident	2025	Jafar Panahi	Iran	
1318	Alice Doesn't Live Here Anymore	1974	Martin Scorsese	United States	
1319	Hud	1963	Martin Ritt	United States	
1320	The Crying Game	1992	Neil Jordan	United Kingdom	
1321	Cruel Story of Youth	1960	Nagisa Ōshima	Japan	
1323	Little Odessa	1994	James Gray	United States	
1324	American Dream	1990	Barbara Kopple	United States	
1325	The Secret Agent	2025	Kleber Mendonça Filho	Brazil	
1327	Nouvelle Vague	2025	Richard Linklater	France	
1328	Days and Nights in the Forest	1995	Satyajit Ray	India	
1329	Welcome II the Terrordome	1995	Ngozi Onwurah	United Kingdom	
1330	Christiane F.	1981	Uli Edel	Germany	
1331	The Shout	1978	Jerzy Skolimowski	United Kingdom	
1332	Frankenstein	2025	Guillermo Del Toro	United States	
1333	KPop Demon Hunters	2025	Maggie Kang, Chris Appelhans	United States	
1334	Wild at Heart	1990	David Lynch	United States	
1335	Marie Antoinette	2006	Sofia Coppola	United States	
1336	Shadows of Forgotten Ancestors	1965	Sergei Parajanov	Ukraine	First Ukrainian film in the collection
1337	The Right Stuff	1983	Philip Kaufman	United States	
1338 (Note: Released on LaserDisc as Spine #336)	The English Patient^{†}	1996	Anthony Minghella	United States	
1339	Grizzly Man	2005	Werner Herzog	United States	
1340	The Shop Around the Corner	1940	Ernst Lubitsch	United States	
1342	Deliverance	1972	John Boorman	United States	
1343	Career Girls	1997	Mike Leigh	United Kingdom	
1344	Chocolat	1988	Claire Denis	France	
1346	Kung Fu Hustle	2004	Stephen Chow	Hong Kong	
1347	Ruggles of Red Gap	1935	Leo McCarey	United States	
1348	Jay Kelly	2025	Noah Baumbach	United States	
1349	The Sweet Hereafter	1997	Atom Egoyan	Canada	
N/A	Sonatine*	1993	Takeshi Kitano	Japan	
N/A	Switchblade Sisters*	1975	Jack Hill	United States	

== List of films released in box sets ==
The Criterion Collection often releases box sets containing multiple films on several discs. Certain box sets themselves are designated spine numbers, as well as spine numbers for the films included in the set. This list includes all box sets not composed of films previously released individually.

† Released on LaserDisc and DVD

Spine	Name of box set	Spine number (of film)	Included films	Year	Director	Country	Notes
66	The Orphic Trilogy	67 (Note: Released on LaserDisc as spine #289)	The Blood of a Poet^{†}	1930	Jean Cocteau	France	
66	The Orphic Trilogy	68	Orpheus	1950	Jean Cocteau	France	
66	The Orphic Trilogy	69	Testament of Orpheus	1959	Jean Cocteau	France	
79	W.C. Fields - Six Short Films	N/A	The Golf Specialist	1930	Monte Brice	United States	
79	W.C. Fields - Six Short Films	N/A	Pool Sharks	1915	Edwin Middleton	United States	Oldest film in the collection
79	W.C. Fields - Six Short Films	N/A	The Pharmacist	1933	Arthur Ripley	United States	
79	W.C. Fields - Six Short Films	N/A	The Fatal Glass of Beer	1933	Clyde Bruckman	United States	
79	W.C. Fields - Six Short Films	N/A	The Barber Shop	1933	Arthur Ripley	United States	
79	W.C. Fields - Six Short Films	N/A	The Dentist	1932	Leslie Pearce	United States	
86	Eisenstein: The Sound Years	87	Alexander Nevsky	1938	Sergei Eisenstein	Soviet Union	
86	Eisenstein: The Sound Years	88	Ivan the Terrible, Part I	1944	Sergei Eisenstein	Soviet Union	Both films are included as the same spine number
86	Eisenstein: The Sound Years	88	Ivan the Terrible, Part II	1958	Sergei Eisenstein	Soviet Union	Both films are included as the same spine number
100	Beastie Boys Video Anthology	N/A	"Intergalactic"	1998	Nathanial Hörnblowér	United States	
100	Beastie Boys Video Anthology	N/A	"Shake Your Rump"	1989	Nathanial Hörnblowér	United States	
100	Beastie Boys Video Anthology	N/A	"Gratitude"	1992	David Perez Shadi	United States	
100	Beastie Boys Video Anthology	N/A	"Something's Got to Give"	1992	Nathanial Hörnblowér	United States	
100	Beastie Boys Video Anthology	N/A	"Sure Shot"	1994	Spike Jonze	United States	
100	Beastie Boys Video Anthology	N/A	"Hey Ladies"	1989	Adam Bernstein	United States	
100	Beastie Boys Video Anthology	N/A	"Looking Down the Barrel of a Gun"	1989	Nathanial Hörnblowér	United States	
100	Beastie Boys Video Anthology	N/A	"Body Movin'"	1998	Nathanial Hörnblowér	United States	
100	Beastie Boys Video Anthology	N/A	"So What'Cha Want"	1992	Nathanial Hörnblowér	United States	
100	Beastie Boys Video Anthology	N/A	"Sabotage"	1994	Spike Jonze	United States	
100	Beastie Boys Video Anthology	N/A	"Shadrach"	1989	Nathanial Hörnblowér	United States	
100	Beastie Boys Video Anthology	N/A	"Three MCs and One DJ"	1999	Nathanial Hörnblowér	United States	
100	Beastie Boys Video Anthology	N/A	"Ricky's Theme"	1994	Spike Jonze	United States	
100	Beastie Boys Video Anthology	N/A	"Pass the Mic"	1992	Nathanial Hörnblowér	United States	
100	Beastie Boys Video Anthology	N/A	"Holy Snappers"	1981	Nathanial Hörnblowér	United States	
100	Beastie Boys Video Anthology	N/A	"Root Down"	1995	Evan Bernard	United States	
100	Beastie Boys Video Anthology	N/A	"Netty's Girl"	1992	Tamra Davis	United States	
100	Beastie Boys Video Anthology	N/A	"Alive"	1999	Nathanial Hörnblowér	United States	
124	Carl Theodor Dreyer	125	Day of Wrath	1943	Carl Theodor Dreyer	Denmark	
124	Carl Theodor Dreyer	126	Ordet	1955	Carl Theodor Dreyer	Denmark	
124	Carl Theodor Dreyer	127	Gertrud	1964	Carl Theodor Dreyer	Denmark	
124	Carl Theodor Dreyer	128	Carl Th. Dreyer - My Metier	1995	Torben Skjødt Jensen	Denmark	
167	The Complete Monterey Pop Festival	168 (Note: Released on LaserDisc as Spine #43)	Monterey Pop^{†}	1968	D.A. Pennebaker	United States	
167	The Complete Monterey Pop Festival	169	Jimi Plays Monterey & Shake! Otis at Monterey	1986	D.A. Pennebaker, Chris Hegedus	United States	
176	The Killers	N/A	The Killers	1946	Robert Siodmak	United States	
176	The Killers	N/A	The Killers	1964	Don Siegel	United States	
179	I Am Curious	180	I Am Curious - Yellow	1967	Vilgot Sjöman	Sweden	
179	I Am Curious	181	I Am Curious - Blue	1967	Vilgot Sjöman	Sweden	
184	By Brakhage: An Anthology, Volume One	N/A	Desistfilm	1954	Stan Brakhage	United States	
184	By Brakhage: An Anthology, Volume One	N/A	Wedlock House: An Intercourse	1959	Stan Brakhage	United States	
184	By Brakhage: An Anthology, Volume One	N/A	Dog Star Man	1961-1964	Stan Brakhage	United States	
184	By Brakhage: An Anthology, Volume One	N/A	The Act of Seeing with One's Own Eyes	1971	Stan Brakhage	United States	
184	By Brakhage: An Anthology, Volume One	N/A	Cat's Cradle	1959	Stan Brakhage	United States	
184	By Brakhage: An Anthology, Volume One	N/A	Window Water Baby Moving	1959	Stan Brakhage	United States	
184	By Brakhage: An Anthology, Volume One	N/A	Mothlight	1963	Stan Brakhage	United States	
184	By Brakhage: An Anthology, Volume One	N/A	Eye Myth	1967	Stan Brakhage	United States	
184	By Brakhage: An Anthology, Volume One	N/A	The Wold-Shadow	1972	Stan Brakhage	United States	
184	By Brakhage: An Anthology, Volume One	N/A	The Garden of Earthly Delights	1981	Stan Brakhage	United States	
184	By Brakhage: An Anthology, Volume One	N/A	The Stars Are Beautiful	1974	Stan Brakhage	United States	
184	By Brakhage: An Anthology, Volume One	N/A	Kindering	1987	Stan Brakhage	United States	
184	By Brakhage: An Anthology, Volume One	N/A	I... Dreaming	1988	Stan Brakhage	United States	
184	By Brakhage: An Anthology, Volume One	N/A	The Dante Quartet	1987	Stan Brakhage	United States	
184	By Brakhage: An Anthology, Volume One	N/A	Night Music	1986	Stan Brakhage	United States	
184	By Brakhage: An Anthology, Volume One	N/A	Rage Net	1988	Stan Brakhage	United States	
184	By Brakhage: An Anthology, Volume One	N/A	Glaze of Cathexis	1990	Stan Brakhage	United States	
184	By Brakhage: An Anthology, Volume One	N/A	Delicacies of Molten Horror Synapse	1990	Stan Brakhage	United States	
184	By Brakhage: An Anthology, Volume One	N/A	Untitled (For Marilyn)	1992	Stan Brakhage	United States	
184	By Brakhage: An Anthology, Volume One	N/A	Black Ice	1994	Stan Brakhage	United States	
184	By Brakhage: An Anthology, Volume One	N/A	Study in Color and Black and White	1993	Stan Brakhage	United States	
184	By Brakhage: An Anthology, Volume One	N/A	Stellar	1993	Stan Brakhage	United States	
184	By Brakhage: An Anthology, Volume One	N/A	Crack Glass Eulogy	1991	Stan Brakhage	United States	
184	By Brakhage: An Anthology, Volume One	N/A	The Dark Tower	1999	Stan Brakhage	United States	
184	By Brakhage: An Anthology, Volume One	N/A	Commingled Containers	1996	Stan Brakhage	United States	
184	By Brakhage: An Anthology, Volume One	N/A	Lovesong	2001	Stan Brakhage	United States	
185	The Adventures of Antoine Doinel	186	Stolen Kisses	1968	François Truffaut	France	
185	The Adventures of Antoine Doinel	187	Bed and Board	1970	François Truffaut	France	
185	The Adventures of Antoine Doinel	189	Love on the Run	1979	François Truffaut	France	
203	The BRD Trilogy	204	The Marriage of Maria Braun	1979	Rainer Werner Fassbinder	West Germany	
203	The BRD Trilogy	205	Veronika Voss	1982	Rainer Werner Fassbinder	West Germany	
203	The BRD Trilogy	206	Lola	1981	Rainer Werner Fassbinder	West Germany	
208	A Film Trilogy by Ingmar Bergman	209 (Note: Released on LaserDisc as Spine #246)	Through a Glass Darkly^{†}	1961	Ingmar Bergman	Sweden	
208	A Film Trilogy by Ingmar Bergman	210 (Note: Released on LaserDisc as Spine #254)	Winter Light^{†}	1963	Ingmar Bergman	Sweden	
208	A Film Trilogy by Ingmar Bergman	211 (Note: Released on LaserDisc as Spine #166)	The Silence^{†}	1963	Ingmar Bergman	Sweden	
232	A Story of Floating Weeds/Floating Weeds: Two Films by Yasujirō Ozu	N/A	A Story of Floating Weeds	1934	Yasujirō Ozu	Japan	
232	A Story of Floating Weeds/Floating Weeds: Two Films by Yasujirō Ozu	N/A	Floating Weeds^{†} (Note: Released on LaserDisc as Spine #76)	1959	Yasujirō Ozu	Japan	
239	The Lower Depths	N/A	The Lower Depths	1957	Akira Kurosawa	Japan	
239	The Lower Depths	N/A	The Lower Depths	1936	Jean Renoir	France	
241	Stage and Spectacle: Three Films by Jean Renoir	242 (Note: Released on LaserDisc as Spine #162)	The Golden Coach^{†}	1953	Jean Renoir	France	
241	Stage and Spectacle: Three Films by Jean Renoir	243 (Note: Released on LaserDisc as Spine #163)	French Cancan^{†}	1955	Jean Renoir	France	
241	Stage and Spectacle: Three Films by Jean Renoir	244	Elena and Her Men	1956	Jean Renoir	France	
250	John Cassavettes: Five Films	251	Shadows	1959	John Cassavetes	United States	
250	John Cassavettes: Five Films	252	Faces	1968	John Cassavetes	United States	
250	John Cassavettes: Five Films	253	A Woman Under the Influence	1974	John Cassavetes	United States	
250	John Cassavettes: Five Films	254	The Killing of a Chinese Bookie	1976	John Cassavetes	United States	
250	John Cassavettes: Five Films	255	Opening Night	1977	John Cassavetes	United States	
261	Fanny and Alexander	262	Fanny and Alexander: Theatrical Version	1982	Ingmar Bergman	Sweden	
261	Fanny and Alexander	263	Fanny and Alexander: Television Version	1983	Ingmar Bergman	Sweden	
261	Fanny and Alexander	264	The Making of Fanny and Alexander	1982	Ingmar Bergman	Sweden	
282	Andrzej Wajda: Three War Films	283	A Generation	1955	Andrzej Wajda	Poland	
282	Andrzej Wajda: Three War Films	284	Kanal	1957	Andrzej Wajda	Poland	
282	Andrzej Wajda: Three War Films	285 (Note: Released on LaserDisc as spine #242)	Ashes and Diamonds^{†}	1958	Andrzej Wajda	Poland	
327	3 Films by Louis Malle	328	Murmur of the Heart	1971	Louis Malle	France	
327	3 Films by Louis Malle	329	Lacombe, Lucien	1974	Louis Malle	France	
327	3 Films by Louis Malle	330	Au Revoir les Enfants	1987	Louis Malle	France	
342	Six Moral Tales	343	The Bakery Girl of Monceau	1963	Éric Rohmer	France	
342	Six Moral Tales	344	Suzanne's Career	1963	Éric Rohmer	France	
342	Six Moral Tales	345	My Night at Maud's	1969	Éric Rohmer	France	
342	Six Moral Tales	346	La Collectionneuse	1967	Éric Rohmer	France	
342	Six Moral Tales	347	Claire's Knee	1970	Éric Rohmer	France	
342	Six Moral Tales	348	Love in the Afternoon	1972	Éric Rohmer	France	
360	Symbiopsychotaxiplasm: Two Takes by William Greaves	N/A	Symbiopsychotaxiplasm Take One	1968	William Greaves	United States	
360	Symbiopsychotaxiplasm: Two Takes by William Greaves	N/A	Symbiopsychotaxiplasm Take 2½	2005	William Greaves	United States	
364	Monsters and Madmen	365	First Man into Space	1959	Robert Day	United States	
364	Monsters and Madmen	366	The Atomic Submarine	1959	Spencer G. Bennet	United States	
364	Monsters and Madmen	367	The Haunted Strangler	1958	Robert Day	United States	
364	Monsters and Madmen	368	Corridors of Blood	1959	Robert Day	United States	
369	Paul Robeson: Portraits of the Artist	N/A	Borderline	1930	Kenneth Macpherson	United Kingdom	
369	Paul Robeson: Portraits of the Artist	370 (Note: Released on LaserDisc as Spine #202)	The Emperor Jones^{†}	1933	Dudley Murphy	United States	
369	Paul Robeson: Portraits of the Artist	371	Body and Soul	1925	Oscar Micheaux	United States	
369	Paul Robeson: Portraits of the Artist	N/A	Paul Robeson: Tribute to an Artist	1979	Saul J. Turell	United States	
369	Paul Robeson: Portraits of the Artist	372	Sanders of the River	1935	Zoltán Korda	United Kingdom	
369	Paul Robeson: Portraits of the Artist	N/A	Jericho	1937	Thornton Freeland	United Kingdom	
369	Paul Robeson: Portraits of the Artist	373	The Proud Valley	1940	Pen Tennyson	United Kingdom	
369	Paul Robeson: Portraits of the Artist	N/A	Native Land	1942	Leo Hurwitz, Paul Strand	United States	
387	La Jetée/Sans Soleil	N/A	La Jetée	1963	Chris Marker	France	
387	La Jetée/Sans Soleil	N/A	Sans Soleil	1983	Chris Marker	France	
392	Three Films by Hiroshi Teshigahara	393	Pitfall	1962	Hiroshi Teshigahara	Japan	
392	Three Films by Hiroshi Teshigahara	394	Woman in the Dunes	1964	Hiroshi Teshigahara	Japan	
392	Three Films by Hiroshi Teshigahara	395	The Face of Another	1966	Hiroshi Teshigahara	Japan	
418	4 by Agnès Varda	419	La Pointe Courte	1955	Agnès Varda	France	
418	4 by Agnès Varda	73	Cléo from 5 to 7^{†}	1962	Agnès Varda	France	Previously released individually
418	4 by Agnès Varda	420	Le Bonheur	1965	Agnès Varda	France	
418	4 by Agnès Varda	74	Vagabond^{†}	1985	Agnès Varda	France	Previously released individually
468	Science is Fiction: 23 Films by Jean Painlevé	N/A	Hyas and Stenorhynchus	1927	Jean Painlevé	France	
468	Science is Fiction: 23 Films by Jean Painlevé	N/A	Sea Urchins	1954	Jean Painlevé	France	
468	Science is Fiction: 23 Films by Jean Painlevé	N/A	How Some Jellyfish Are Born	1960	Jean Painlevé	France	
468	Science is Fiction: 23 Films by Jean Painlevé	N/A	Liquid Crystals	1978	Jean Painlevé	France	
468	Science is Fiction: 23 Films by Jean Painlevé	N/A	The Sea Horse	1933	Jean Painlevé	France	
468	Science is Fiction: 23 Films by Jean Painlevé	N/A	The Love Life of the Octopus	1967	Jean Painlevé	France	
468	Science is Fiction: 23 Films by Jean Painlevé	N/A	Shrimp Stories	1964	Jean Painlevé	France	
468	Science is Fiction: 23 Films by Jean Painlevé	N/A	Acera, or the Witches' Dance	1972	Jean Painlevé	France	
468	Science is Fiction: 23 Films by Jean Painlevé	N/A	The Vampire	1945	Jean Painlevé	France	
468	Science is Fiction: 23 Films by Jean Painlevé	N/A	Freshwater Assassins	1947	Jean Painlevé	France	
468	Science is Fiction: 23 Films by Jean Painlevé	N/A	Sea Ballerinas	1956	Jean Painlevé	France	
468	Science is Fiction: 23 Films by Jean Painlevé	N/A	Diatoms	1968	Jean Painlevé	France	
468	Science is Fiction: 23 Films by Jean Painlevé	N/A	Pigeons in the Square	1982	Jean Painlevé	France	
468	Science is Fiction: 23 Films by Jean Painlevé	N/A	The Octopus	1927	Jean Painlevé	France	
468	Science is Fiction: 23 Films by Jean Painlevé	N/A	Sea Urchiins	1928	Jean Painlevé	France	
468	Science is Fiction: 23 Films by Jean Painlevé	N/A	Daphnia	1928	Jean Painlevé	France	
468	Science is Fiction: 23 Films by Jean Painlevé	N/A	The Stickleback's Egg	1925	Jean Painlevé	France	
468	Science is Fiction: 23 Films by Jean Painlevé	N/A	Experimental Treatment of a Hemorrhage in a Dog	1930	Jean Painlevé	France	
468	Science is Fiction: 23 Films by Jean Painlevé	N/A	The Fourth Dimension	1936	Jean Painlevé	France	
468	Science is Fiction: 23 Films by Jean Painlevé	N/A	The Struggle for Survival	1937	Jean Painlevé	France	
468	Science is Fiction: 23 Films by Jean Painlevé	N/A	Voyage to the Sky	1937	Jean Painlevé	France	
468	Science is Fiction: 23 Films by Jean Painlevé	N/A	Similarities Between Length and Speed	1937	Jean Painlevé	France	
468	Science is Fiction: 23 Films by Jean Painlevé	N/A	Bluebeard	1938	Jean Painlevé	France	
471	Pigs, Pimps & Prostitutes: 3 Films by Shōhei Imamura	472	Pigs and Battleships	1962	Shōhei Imamura	Japan	
471	Pigs, Pimps & Prostitutes: 3 Films by Shōhei Imamura	473	The Insect Woman	1963	Shōhei Imamura	Japan	
471	Pigs, Pimps & Prostitutes: 3 Films by Shōhei Imamura	474	Intentions of Murder	1964	Shōhei Imamura	Japan	
495	The Golden Age of Television	N/A	"Marty"	1953	Paddy Chayefsky	United States	Episode of The Philco Television Playhouse
495	The Golden Age of Television	N/A	"Patterns"	1955	Fielder Cook	United States	Episode of Kraft Television Theatre
495	The Golden Age of Television	N/A	"No Time for Sergeants"	1955	Alex Segal	United States	Episode of United States Steel Hour
495	The Golden Age of Television	N/A	"A Wind from the South"	1955	Daniel Petrie	United States	Episode of United States Steel Hour
495	The Golden Age of Television	N/A	"Requiem for a Heavyweight"	1956	Ralph Nelson	United States	Episode of Playhouse 90
495	The Golden Age of Television	N/A	"Bang the Drum Slowly"	1957	Daniel Petrie	United States	Episode of United States Steel Hour
495	The Golden Age of Television	N/A	"The Comedian"	1957	John Frankenheimer	United States	Episode of Playhouse 90
495	The Golden Age of Television	N/A	"Days of Wine and Roses"	1958	John Frankenheimer	United States	Episode of Playhouse 90
500	Roberto Rossellini’s War Trilogy	497 (Note: Released on LaserDisc as Spine #257)	Rome, Open City^{†}	1946	Roberto Rossellini	Italy	
500	Roberto Rossellini’s War Trilogy	498	Paisan	1946	Roberto Rossellini	Italy	
500	Roberto Rossellini’s War Trilogy	499	Germany, Year Zero	1948	Roberto Rossellini	Italy	
508	Letters from Fontainhas: Three Films by Pedro Costa	509	Ossos	1997	Pedro Costa	Portugal	First Portuguese film(s) in the collection
508	Letters from Fontainhas: Three Films by Pedro Costa	510	In Vanda's Room	2000	Pedro Costa	Portugal	First Portuguese film(s) in the collection
508	Letters from Fontainhas: Three Films by Pedro Costa	511	Colossal Youth	2006	Pedro Costa	Portugal	First Portuguese film(s) in the collection
524	The Only Son/There Was a Father: Two Films by Yasujirō Ozu	525	The Only Son	1936	Yasujirō Ozu	Japan	
524	The Only Son/There Was a Father: Two Films by Yasujirō Ozu	526	There Was a Father	1942	Yasujirō Ozu	Japan	
528	3 Silent Classics by Josef von Sternberg	529	Underworld	1927	Josef von Sternberg	United States	
528	3 Silent Classics by Josef von Sternberg	530	The Last Command	1928	Josef von Sternberg	United States	
528	3 Silent Classics by Josef von Sternberg	531	The Docks of New York	1928	Josef von Sternberg	United States	
578	The Complete Jean Vigo	N/A	À propos de Nice	1930	Jean Vigo	France	
578	The Complete Jean Vigo	N/A	Zéro de conduite	1933	Jean Vigo	France	
578	The Complete Jean Vigo	N/A	L'Atalante	1934	Jean Vigo	France	
587	Three Colors	588	Three Colors: Blue	1993	Krzysztof Kieślowski	France	
587	Three Colors	589	Three Colors: White	1994	Krzysztof Kieślowski	Poland	
587	Three Colors	590	Three Colors: Red	1994	Krzysztof Kieślowski	Switzerland	
603	David Lean Directs Noël Coward	76	Brief Encounter^{†}	1945	David Lean	United Kingdom	Previously released individually
603	David Lean Directs Noël Coward	604 (Note: Released on LaserDisc as Spine #263)	In Which We Serve^{†}	1942	David Lean, Noël Coward	United Kingdom	
603	David Lean Directs Noël Coward	605	This Happy Breed	1944	David Lean	United Kingdom	
603	David Lean Directs Noël Coward	606	Blithe Spirit	1945	David Lean	United Kingdom	
607	A Hollis Frampton Odyssey	N/A	Manual of Arms	1966	Hollis Frampton	United States	
607	A Hollis Frampton Odyssey	N/A	Process Red	1966	Hollis Frampton	United States	
607	A Hollis Frampton Odyssey	N/A	Maxwell's Demon	1968	Hollis Frampton	United States	
607	A Hollis Frampton Odyssey	N/A	Surface Tension	1968	Hollis Frampton	United States	
607	A Hollis Frampton Odyssey	N/A	Carrots & Peas	1969	Hollis Frampton	United States	
607	A Hollis Frampton Odyssey	N/A	Lemon	1969	Hollis Frampton	United States	
607	A Hollis Frampton Odyssey	N/A	Zorns Lemma	1970	Hollis Frampton	United States	
607	A Hollis Frampton Odyssey	N/A	(nostalgia)	1971	Hollis Frampton	United States	
607	A Hollis Frampton Odyssey	N/A	Poetic Justice	1972	Hollis Frampton	United States	
607	A Hollis Frampton Odyssey	N/A	Critical Mass	1971	Hollis Frampton	United States	
607	A Hollis Frampton Odyssey	N/A	The Birth of Magellan: Cadenza I	1977	Hollis Frampton	United States	
607	A Hollis Frampton Odyssey	N/A	0-4	1969	Hollis Frampton	United States	
607	A Hollis Frampton Odyssey	N/A	697-700	1974	Hollis Frampton	United States	
607	A Hollis Frampton Odyssey	N/A	Ingenivm Nobis Ipsa Pvella Fecit, Part I	1975	Hollis Frampton	United States	
607	A Hollis Frampton Odyssey	N/A	Magellan: At the Gates of Death, Part I: The Red Gate 1,0	1976	Hollis Frampton	United States	
607	A Hollis Frampton Odyssey	N/A	Winter Solstice	1974	Hollis Frampton	United States	
607	A Hollis Frampton Odyssey	N/A	Gloria!	1979	Hollis Frampton	United States	
517	By Brakhage: An Anthology, Volume Two	N/A	The Wonder Ring	1955	Stan Brakhage	United States	
517	By Brakhage: An Anthology, Volume Two	N/A	The Dead	1960	Stan Brakhage	United States	
517	By Brakhage: An Anthology, Volume Two	N/A	Two: Creeley/McClure	1965	Stan Brakhage	United States	
517	By Brakhage: An Anthology, Volume Two	N/A	23rd Psalm Branch	1967	Stan Brakhage	United States	
517	By Brakhage: An Anthology, Volume Two	N/A	Scenes from Under Childhood, Section One	1967	Stan Brakhage	United States	
517	By Brakhage: An Anthology, Volume Two	N/A	The Machine of Eden	1970	Stan Brakhage	United States	
517	By Brakhage: An Anthology, Volume Two	N/A	Star Garden	1974	Stan Brakhage	United States	
517	By Brakhage: An Anthology, Volume Two	N/A	Desert	1976	Stan Brakhage	United States	
517	By Brakhage: An Anthology, Volume Two	N/A	The Process	1972	Stan Brakhage	United States	
517	By Brakhage: An Anthology, Volume Two	N/A	Burial Path	1978	Stan Brakhage	United States	
517	By Brakhage: An Anthology, Volume Two	N/A	Duplicity III	1980	Stan Brakhage	United States	
517	By Brakhage: An Anthology, Volume Two	N/A	The Domain of the Moment	1977	Stan Brakhage	United States	
517	By Brakhage: An Anthology, Volume Two	N/A	Murder Psalm	1980	Stan Brakhage	United States	
517	By Brakhage: An Anthology, Volume Two	N/A	Arabic	1982	Stan Brakhage	United States	
517	By Brakhage: An Anthology, Volume Two	N/A	Visions in Meditation #1	1989	Stan Brakhage	United States	
517	By Brakhage: An Anthology, Volume Two	N/A	Visions in Meditation #2 (Mesa Verde)	1989	Stan Brakhage	United States	
517	By Brakhage: An Anthology, Volume Two	N/A	Visions in Meditation #3 (Plato's Cave)	1990	Stan Brakhage	United States	
517	By Brakhage: An Anthology, Volume Two	N/A	Visions in Medication #4 (D.H. Lawrence)	1990	Stan Brakhage	United States	
517	By Brakhage: An Anthology, Volume Two	N/A	Unconscious London Strata	1982	Stan Brakhage	United States	
517	By Brakhage: An Anthology, Volume Two	N/A	Boulder Blues and Pearls and. . .	1992	Stan Brakhage	United States	
517	By Brakhage: An Anthology, Volume Two	N/A	The Mammals of Victoria	1994	Stan Brakhage	United States	
517	By Brakhage: An Anthology, Volume Two	N/A	From: First Hymn to the Night - Novalis	1994	Stan Brakhage	United States	
517	By Brakhage: An Anthology, Volume Two	N/A	I Take These Truths	1995	Stan Brakhage	United States	
517	By Brakhage: An Anthology, Volume Two	N/A	The Cat of the Worm's Green Realm	1997	Stan Brakhage	United States	
517	By Brakhage: An Anthology, Volume Two	N/A	Yggdrasill: Whose Roots are Stars in the Human Mind	1997	Stan Brakhage	United States	
517	By Brakhage: An Anthology, Volume Two	N/A	“. . .” Reel Five	1998	Stan Brakhage	United States	
517	By Brakhage: An Anthology, Volume Two	N/A	Persian Series 1-3	1999	Stan Brakhage	United States	
517	By Brakhage: An Anthology, Volume Two	N/A	Chinese Series	2003	Stan Brakhage	United States	
518	By Brakhage: An Anthology, Volumes One and Two	N/A	Desistfilm	1954	Stan Brakhage	United States	Previously released in a box set
518	By Brakhage: An Anthology, Volumes One and Two	N/A	Wedlock House: An Intercourse	1959	Stan Brakhage	United States	Previously released in a box set
518	By Brakhage: An Anthology, Volumes One and Two	N/A	Dog Star Man	1961-1964	Stan Brakhage	United States	Previously released in a box set
518	By Brakhage: An Anthology, Volumes One and Two	N/A	The Act of Seeing with One's Own Eyes	1971	Stan Brakhage	United States	Previously released in a box set
518	By Brakhage: An Anthology, Volumes One and Two	N/A	Cat's Cradle	1959	Stan Brakhage	United States	Previously released in a box set
518	By Brakhage: An Anthology, Volumes One and Two	N/A	Window Water Baby Moving	1959	Stan Brakhage	United States	Previously released in a box set
518	By Brakhage: An Anthology, Volumes One and Two	N/A	Mothlight	1963	Stan Brakhage	United States	Previously released in a box set
518	By Brakhage: An Anthology, Volumes One and Two	N/A	Eye Myth	1967	Stan Brakhage	United States	Previously released in a box set
518	By Brakhage: An Anthology, Volumes One and Two	N/A	The Wold-Shadow	1972	Stan Brakhage	United States	Previously released in a box set
518	By Brakhage: An Anthology, Volumes One and Two	N/A	The Garden of Earthly Delights	1981	Stan Brakhage	United States	Previously released in a box set
518	By Brakhage: An Anthology, Volumes One and Two	N/A	The Stars Are Beautiful	1974	Stan Brakhage	United States	Previously released in a box set
518	By Brakhage: An Anthology, Volumes One and Two	N/A	Kindering	1987	Stan Brakhage	United States	Previously released in a box set
518	By Brakhage: An Anthology, Volumes One and Two	N/A	I... Dreaming	1988	Stan Brakhage	United States	Previously released in a box set
518	By Brakhage: An Anthology, Volumes One and Two	N/A	The Dante Quartet	1987	Stan Brakhage	United States	Previously released in a box set
518	By Brakhage: An Anthology, Volumes One and Two	N/A	Night Music	1986	Stan Brakhage	United States	Previously released in a box set
518	By Brakhage: An Anthology, Volumes One and Two	N/A	Rage Net	1988	Stan Brakhage	United States	Previously released in a box set
518	By Brakhage: An Anthology, Volumes One and Two	N/A	Glaze of Cathexis	1990	Stan Brakhage	United States	Previously released in a box set
518	By Brakhage: An Anthology, Volumes One and Two	N/A	Delicacies of Molten Horror Synapse	1990	Stan Brakhage	United States	Previously released in a box set
518	By Brakhage: An Anthology, Volumes One and Two	N/A	Untitled (For Marilyn)	1992	Stan Brakhage	United States	Previously released in a box set
518	By Brakhage: An Anthology, Volumes One and Two	N/A	Black Ice	1994	Stan Brakhage	United States	Previously released in a box set
518	By Brakhage: An Anthology, Volumes One and Two	N/A	Study in Color and Black and White	1993	Stan Brakhage	United States	Previously released in a box set
518	By Brakhage: An Anthology, Volumes One and Two	N/A	Stellar	1993	Stan Brakhage	United States	Previously released in a box set
518	By Brakhage: An Anthology, Volumes One and Two	N/A	Crack Glass Eulogy	1991	Stan Brakhage	United States	Previously released in a box set
518	By Brakhage: An Anthology, Volumes One and Two	N/A	The Dark Tower	1999	Stan Brakhage	United States	Previously released in a box set
518	By Brakhage: An Anthology, Volumes One and Two	N/A	Commingled Containers	1996	Stan Brakhage	United States	Previously released in a box set
518	By Brakhage: An Anthology, Volumes One and Two	N/A	Lovesong	2001	Stan Brakhage	United States	Previously released in a box set
518	By Brakhage: An Anthology, Volumes One and Two	N/A	The Wonder Ring	1955	Stan Brakhage	United States	Previously released in a box set
518	By Brakhage: An Anthology, Volumes One and Two	N/A	The Dead	1960	Stan Brakhage	United States	Previously released in a box set
518	By Brakhage: An Anthology, Volumes One and Two	N/A	Two: Creeley/McClure	1965	Stan Brakhage	United States	Previously released in a box set
518	By Brakhage: An Anthology, Volumes One and Two	N/A	23rd Psalm Branch	1967	Stan Brakhage	United States	Previously released in a box set
518	By Brakhage: An Anthology, Volumes One and Two	N/A	Scenes from Under Childhood, Section One	1967	Stan Brakhage	United States	Previously released in a box set
518	By Brakhage: An Anthology, Volumes One and Two	N/A	The Machine of Eden	1970	Stan Brakhage	United States	Previously released in a box set
518	By Brakhage: An Anthology, Volumes One and Two	N/A	Star Garden	1974	Stan Brakhage	United States	Previously released in a box set
518	By Brakhage: An Anthology, Volumes One and Two	N/A	Desert	1976	Stan Brakhage	United States	Previously released in a box set
518	By Brakhage: An Anthology, Volumes One and Two	N/A	The Process	1972	Stan Brakhage	United States	Previously released in a box set
518	By Brakhage: An Anthology, Volumes One and Two	N/A	Burial Path	1978	Stan Brakhage	United States	Previously released in a box set
518	By Brakhage: An Anthology, Volumes One and Two	N/A	Duplicity III	1980	Stan Brakhage	United States	Previously released in a box set
518	By Brakhage: An Anthology, Volumes One and Two	N/A	The Domain of the Moment	1977	Stan Brakhage	United States	Previously released in a box set
518	By Brakhage: An Anthology, Volumes One and Two	N/A	Murder Psalm	1980	Stan Brakhage	United States	Previously released in a box set
518	By Brakhage: An Anthology, Volumes One and Two	N/A	Arabic	1982	Stan Brakhage	United States	Previously released in a box set
518	By Brakhage: An Anthology, Volumes One and Two	N/A	Visions in Meditation #1	1989	Stan Brakhage	United States	Previously released in a box set
518	By Brakhage: An Anthology, Volumes One and Two	N/A	Visions in Meditation #2 (Mesa Verde)	1989	Stan Brakhage	United States	Previously released in a box set
518	By Brakhage: An Anthology, Volumes One and Two	N/A	Visions in Meditation #3 (Plato's Cave)	1990	Stan Brakhage	United States	Previously released in a box set
518	By Brakhage: An Anthology, Volumes One and Two	N/A	Visions in Medication #4 (D.H. Lawrence)	1990	Stan Brakhage	United States	Previously released in a box set
518	By Brakhage: An Anthology, Volumes One and Two	N/A	Unconscious London Strata	1982	Stan Brakhage	United States	Previously released in a box set
518	By Brakhage: An Anthology, Volumes One and Two	N/A	Boulder Blues and Pearls and. . .	1992	Stan Brakhage	United States	Previously released in a box set
518	By Brakhage: An Anthology, Volumes One and Two	N/A	The Mammals of Victoria	1994	Stan Brakhage	United States	Previously released in a box set
518	By Brakhage: An Anthology, Volumes One and Two	N/A	From: First Hymn to the Night - Novalis	1994	Stan Brakhage	United States	Previously released in a box set
518	By Brakhage: An Anthology, Volumes One and Two	N/A	I Take These Truths	1995	Stan Brakhage	United States	Previously released in a box set
518	By Brakhage: An Anthology, Volumes One and Two	N/A	The Cat of the Worm's Green Realm	1997	Stan Brakhage	United States	Previously released in a box set
518	By Brakhage: An Anthology, Volumes One and Two	N/A	Yggdrasill: Whose Roots are Stars in the Human Mind	1997	Stan Brakhage	United States	Previously released in a box set
518	By Brakhage: An Anthology, Volumes One and Two	N/A	“. . .” Reel Five	1998	Stan Brakhage	United States	Previously released in a box set
518	By Brakhage: An Anthology, Volumes One and Two	N/A	Persian Series 1-3	1999	Stan Brakhage	United States	Previously released in a box set
518	By Brakhage: An Anthology, Volumes One and Two	N/A	Chinese Series	2003	Stan Brakhage	United States	Previously released in a box set
631	Trilogy of Life	632	The Decameron	1971	Pier Paolo Pasolini	Italy	
631	Trilogy of Life	633	The Canterbury Tales	1972	Pier Paolo Pasolini	Italy	
631	Trilogy of Life	634	Arabian Nights	1974	Pier Paolo Pasolini	Italy	
639	The Qatsi Trilogy	640	Koyaanisqatsi	1983	Godfrey Reggio	United States	
639	The Qatsi Trilogy	641	Powaqqatsi	1988	Godfrey Reggio	United States	
639	The Qatsi Trilogy	642	Naqoyqatsi	2002	Godfrey Reggio	United States	
655	Pierre Etaix	N/A	The Suitor	1963	Pierre Étaix	France	
655	Pierre Etaix	N/A	Yoyo	1965	Pierre Étaix	France	
655	Pierre Etaix	N/A	As Long as You've Got Your Health	1966	Pierre Étaix	France	
655	Pierre Etaix	N/A	Le Grand Amour	1969	Pierre Étaix	France	
655	Pierre Etaix	N/A	Land of Milk and Honey	1971	Pierre Étaix	France	
672	3 Films by Roberto Rossellini Starring Ingrid Bergman	673	Stromboli	1950	Roberto Rossellini	Italy	
672	3 Films by Roberto Rossellini Starring Ingrid Bergman	674	Europe '51	1952	Roberto Rossellini	Italy	
672	3 Films by Roberto Rossellini Starring Ingrid Bergman	675	Journey to Italy	1954	Roberto Rossellini	Italy	
679	Zatoichi: The Blind Swordsman	N/A	The Tale of Zatoichi	1962	Kenji Misumi	Japan	
679	Zatoichi: The Blind Swordsman	N/A	The Tale of Zatoichi Continues	1962	Kazuo Mori	Japan	
679	Zatoichi: The Blind Swordsman	N/A	New Tale of Zatoichi	1963	Tokuzō Tanaka	Japan	
679	Zatoichi: The Blind Swordsman	N/A	Zatoichi the Fugitive	1963	Tokuzō Tanaka	Japan	
679	Zatoichi: The Blind Swordsman	N/A	Zatoichi on the Road	1963	Kimiyoshi Yasuda	Japan	
679	Zatoichi: The Blind Swordsman	N/A	Zatoichi and the Chest of Gold	1964	Kazuo Ikehiro	Japan	
679	Zatoichi: The Blind Swordsman	N/A	Zatoichi's Flashing Sword	1964	Kazuo Ikehiro	Japan	
679	Zatoichi: The Blind Swordsman	N/A	Fight, Zatoichi, Fight	1964	Kenji Misumi	Japan	
679	Zatoichi: The Blind Swordsman	N/A	Adventures of Zatoichi	1964	Kimiyoshi Yasuda	Japan	
679	Zatoichi: The Blind Swordsman	N/A	Zatoichi's Revenge	1965	Akira Inoue	Japan	
679	Zatoichi: The Blind Swordsman	N/A	Zatoichi and the Doomed man	1965	Kazuo Mori	Japan	
679	Zatoichi: The Blind Swordsman	N/A	Zatoichi and the Chess Expert	1965	Kenji Misumi	Japan	
679	Zatoichi: The Blind Swordsman	N/A	Zatoichi's Revenge	1966	Tokuzō Tanaka	Japan	
679	Zatoichi: The Blind Swordsman	N/A	Zatoichi's Pilgrimage	1966	Kazuo Ikehiro	Japan	
679	Zatoichi: The Blind Swordsman	N/A	Zatoichi's Cane Sword	1967	Kimiyoshi Yasuda	Japan	
679	Zatoichi: The Blind Swordsman	N/A	Zatoichi the Outlaw	1967	Satsuo Yamamoto	Japan	
679	Zatoichi: The Blind Swordsman	N/A	Zatoichi Challenged	1967	Kenji Misumi	Japan	
679	Zatoichi: The Blind Swordsman	N/A	Zatoichi and the Fugitives	1968	Kimiyoshi Yasuda	Japan	
679	Zatoichi: The Blind Swordsman	N/A	Samaritan Zatoichi	1968	Kenji Misumi	Japan	
679	Zatoichi: The Blind Swordsman	N/A	Zatoichi Meets Yojimbo	1970	Kihachi Okamoto	Japan	
679	Zatoichi: The Blind Swordsman	N/A	Zatoichi Goes to the Fire Festival	1970	Kenji Misumi	Japan	
679	Zatoichi: The Blind Swordsman	N/A	Zatoichi Meets the One-Armed Swordsman	1971	Kihachi Okamoto	Japan	
679	Zatoichi: The Blind Swordsman	N/A	Zatoichi at Large	1972	Kazuo Mori	Japan	
679	Zatoichi: The Blind Swordsman	N/A	Zatoichi in Desperation	1972	Shinatro Katsu	Japan	
679	Zatoichi: The Blind Swordsman	N/A	Zatoichi's Conspiracy	1973	Kimiyoshi Yasuda	Japan	
684	Martin Scorsese’s World Cinema Project No. 1	685	Touki Bouki	1973	Djibril Diop Mambéty	Senegal	First Senegalese film in the collection
684	Martin Scorsese’s World Cinema Project No. 1	686	Redes	1936	Emilio Gómez Muriel, Fred Zinnemann	Mexico	
684	Martin Scorsese’s World Cinema Project No. 1	687	A River Called Titas	1973	Ritwik Ghatak	Bangladesh	First Bangladeshi film in the collection
684	Martin Scorsese’s World Cinema Project No. 1	688	Dry Summer	1964	Metin Erksan	Turkey	First Turkish film in the collection
684	Martin Scorsese’s World Cinema Project No. 1	689	Trances	1981	Ahmed El Maanouni	Morocco	First Moroccan film in the collection
684	Martin Scorsese’s World Cinema Project No. 1	690	The Housemaid	1960	Kim Ki-young	South Korea	
713	The Essential Jacques Demy	714	Lola	1961	Jacques Demy	France	
713	The Essential Jacques Demy	715	Bay of Angels	1963	Jacques Demy	France	
713	The Essential Jacques Demy	716 (Note: Released on LaserDisc as Spine #328)	The Umbrellas of Cherbourg^{†}	1964	Jacques Demy	France	
713	The Essential Jacques Demy	717	The Young Girls of Rochefort	1967	Jacques Demy	France	
713	The Essential Jacques Demy	718	Donkey Skin	1970	Jacques Demy	France	
713	The Essential Jacques Demy	719	Une chambre en ville	1982	Jacques Demy	France	
729	The Complete Jacques Tati	730 (Note: Released on LaserDisc as Spine #94)	Jour de fête^{†}	1949	Jacques Tati	France	
729	The Complete Jacques Tati	110	Monsieur Hulot's Holiday^{†}	1953	Jacques Tati	France	Previously released individually
729	The Complete Jacques Tati	111	Mon Oncle^{†}	1958	Jacques Tati	France	Previously released individually
729	The Complete Jacques Tati	112	PlayTime	1967	Jacques Tati	France	Previously released individually
729	The Complete Jacques Tati	439	Trafic	1971	Jacques Tati	France	Previously released individually
729	The Complete Jacques Tati	731 (Note: Released on LaserDisc as Spine #129)	Parade^{†}	1974	Jacques Tati	France	
N/A	The Shooting/Ride in the Whirlwind	734	The Shooting	1966	Monte Hellman	United States	
N/A	The Shooting/Ride in the Whirlwind	735	Ride in the Whirlwind	1966	Monte Hellman	United States	
737	Les Blank: Always for Pleasure	N/A	The Blues Accordin’ to Lightnin’ Hopkins	1968	Les Blank	United States	
737	Les Blank: Always for Pleasure	N/A	God Respects Us When We Work, but Loves Us When We Dance	1968	Les Blank	United States	
737	Les Blank: Always for Pleasure	N/A	Spend It All	1971	Les Blank	United States	
737	Les Blank: Always for Pleasure	N/A	A Well Spent Life	1971	Les Blank	United States	
737	Les Blank: Always for Pleasure	N/A	Dry Wood	1973	Les Blank	United States	
737	Les Blank: Always for Pleasure	N/A	Hot Pepper	1973	Les Blank	United States	
737	Les Blank: Always for Pleasure	N/A	Always for Pleasure	1978	Les Blank	United States	
737	Les Blank: Always for Pleasure	N/A	Garlic Is as Good as Ten Mothers	1980	Les Blank	United States	
737	Les Blank: Always for Pleasure	N/A	Sprout Wings and Fly	1983	Les Blank	United States	
737	Les Blank: Always for Pleasure	N/A	In Heaven There Is No Beer?	1984	Les Blank	United States	
737	Les Blank: Always for Pleasure	N/A	Gap-Toothed Woman	1987	Les Blank	United States	
737	Les Blank: Always for Pleasure	N/A	Yum, Yum, Yum! A Taste of Cajun and Creole Cooking	1990	Les Blank	United States	
737	Les Blank: Always for Pleasure	N/A	The Maestro: King of the Cowboy Artists	1994	Les Blank	United States	
737	Les Blank: Always for Pleasure	N/A	Sworn to the Drum: A Tribute to Francisco Aguabella	1995	Les Blank	United States	
N/A	Gates of Heaven/Vernon, Florida	751	Gates of Heaven	1978	Errol Morris	United States	
N/A	Gates of Heaven/Vernon, Florida	752	Vernon, Florida	1981	Errol Morris	United States	
782	The Apu Trilogy	783	Pather Panchali	1955	Satyajit Ray	India	
782	The Apu Trilogy	784	Aparajito	1956	Satyajit Ray	India	
782	The Apu Trilogy	785	Apur Sansar	1959	Satyajit Ray	India	
N/A	The Complete Lady Snowblood	790	Lady Snowblood	1973	Toshiya Fujita	Japan	
N/A	The Complete Lady Snowblood	791	Lady Snowblood: Love Song of Vengeance	1974	Toshiya Fujita	Japan	
N/A	The Emigrants/The New Land	796	The Emigrants	1971	Jan Troell	Sweden	
N/A	The Emigrants/The New Land	797	The New Land	1972	Jan Troell	Sweden	
808	The Kennedy Films of Robert Drew & Associates	N/A	Primary	1960	Robert Drew	United States	
808	The Kennedy Films of Robert Drew & Associates	N/A	Adventures on the New Frontier	1961	Robert Drew	United States	
808	The Kennedy Films of Robert Drew & Associates	N/A	Crisis	1963	Robert Drew	United States	
808	The Kennedy Films of Robert Drew & Associates	N/A	Faces of November	1964	Robert Drew	United States	
813	Wim Wenders: The Road Trilogy	814	Alice in the Cities	1974	Wim Wenders	Germany	
813	Wim Wenders: The Road Trilogy	815	Wrong Move	1975	Wim Wenders	Germany	
813	Wim Wenders: The Road Trilogy	816	Kings of the Road	1976	Wim Wenders	Germany	
841	Lone Wolf and Cub	N/A	Lone Wolf and Cub: Sword of Vengence	1972	Kenji Misumi	Japan	
841	Lone Wolf and Cub	N/A	Lone Wolf and Cub: Baby Cart at the River Styx	1972	Kenji Misumi	Japan	
841	Lone Wolf and Cub	N/A	Lone Wolf and Cub: Baby Cart to Hades	1972	Kenji Misumi	Japan	
841	Lone Wolf and Cub	N/A	Lone Wolf and Cub: Baby Cart in Peril	1972	Buichi Saitō	Japan	
841	Lone Wolf and Cub	N/A	Lone Wolf and Cub: Baby Cart in the Land of Demons	1973	Kenji Misumi	Japan	
841	Lone Wolf and Cub	N/A	Lone Wolf and Cub: White Heaven in Hell	1974	Yoshiyuki Kuroda	Japan	
856	The Before Trilogy	857	Before Sunrise	1995	Richard Linklater	United States	
856	The Before Trilogy	858	Before Sunset	2004	Richard Linklater	United States	
856	The Before Trilogy	859	Before Midnight	2013	Richard Linklater	United States	
873	Martin Scorsese's World Cinema Project No. 2	874	Insiang	1976	Lino Brocka	Philippines	First Filipino film in the collection
873	Martin Scorsese's World Cinema Project No. 2	875	Mysterious Object at Noon	2000	Apichatpong Weerasethakul	Thailand	First Thai film in the collection
873	Martin Scorsese's World Cinema Project No. 2	876	Revenge	1989	Ermek Shinarbayev	Kazakhstan	First Kazakhstani film in the collection
873	Martin Scorsese's World Cinema Project No. 2	877	Limite	1931	Mário Peixoto	Brazil	First Brazilian film in the collection
873	Martin Scorsese's World Cinema Project No. 2	878	Law of the Border	1966	Lütfi Ömer Akad	Turkey	
873	Martin Scorsese's World Cinema Project No. 2	879	Taipei Story	1985	Edward Yang	Taiwan	
881	The Marseille Trilogy	882	Marius	1931	Marc Allégret	France	
881	The Marseille Trilogy	883	Fanny	1932	Marc Allégret	France	
881	The Marseille Trilogy	884	César	1936	Marc Allégret	France	
900	100 Years of Olympic Films: 1912-2012 (Note: As many Olympic films are considered multinational productions, several are listed without countries of origin by the Criterion Collection)	N/A	The Games of the V Olympiad Stockholm, 1912	2016	Adrian Wood		
900	100 Years of Olympic Films: 1912-2012	N/A	The Olympic Games Held at Chamonix in 1924	1924	Jean de Rovera		
900	100 Years of Olympic Films: 1912-2012	N/A	The Olympic Games as They Were Practiced in Ancient Greece	1924	Jean de Rovera		
900	100 Years of Olympic Films: 1912-2012	N/A	The Olympic Games in Paris 1924	1924	Jean de Rovera		
900	100 Years of Olympic Films: 1912-2012	N/A	The White Stadium	1928	Arnold Fanck, Othmar Gurtner	Switzerland	First Swiss film in the collection
900	100 Years of Olympic Films: 1912-2012	N/A	The IX Olympiad in Amsterdam	1928	N/A		The first of only three films in the collection without a credited director
900	100 Years of Olympic Films: 1912-2012	N/A	The Olympic Games, Amsterdam 1928	1928	Wilhelm Prager, Jules Perel	Netherlands	First Dutch film in the collection
900	100 Years of Olympic Films: 1912-2012	N/A	Youth of the World	1936	Carl Junghans	Germany	
900	100 Years of Olympic Films: 1912-2012	N/A	Olympia Part One: Festival of the Nations^{†} (Note: Released on LaserDisc as Spine #338)	1938	Leni Riefenstahl	Germany	
900	100 Years of Olympic Films: 1912-2012	N/A	Olympia Part Two: Festival of Beauty^{†}	1938	Leni Riefenstahl	Germany	
900	100 Years of Olympic Films: 1912-2012	N/A	Fight Without Hate	1948	André Michel		
900	100 Years of Olympic Films: 1912-2012	N/A	XIVth Olympiad: The Glory of Sport	1948	Castleton Knight	United Kingdom	
900	100 Years of Olympic Films: 1912-2012	N/A	The VI Olympics Winter Games, Oslo 1952	1952	Tancred Ibsen	Norway	
900	100 Years of Olympic Films: 1912-2012	N/A	Where the World Meets	1952	Hannu Leminen	Finland	
900	100 Years of Olympic Films: 1912-2012	N/A	Gold and Glory	1953	Hannu Leminen	Finland	
900	100 Years of Olympic Films: 1912-2012	N/A	Memories of the Olympic Summer of 1952	1954	N/A		The second of only three films in the collection without a credited director
900	100 Years of Olympic Films: 1912-2012	N/A	White Vertigo	1956	Giorgio Ferroni	Italy	
900	100 Years of Olympic Films: 1912-2012	N/A	Olympic Games, 1956	1956	Peter Whitchurch		
900	100 Years of Olympic Films: 1912-2012	N/A	Alain Mimoun	1959	Louis Gueguen		
900	100 Years of Olympic Films: 1912-2012	N/A	The Horse in Focus	1956	N/A		The third of only three films in the collection without a credited director
900	100 Years of Olympic Films: 1912-2012	N/A	People, Hopes, Medals	1960	Heribert Meisel		
900	100 Years of Olympic Films: 1912-2012	N/A	The Grand Olympics	1961	Romolo Marcellini	Italy	
900	100 Years of Olympic Films: 1912-2012	N/A	IX Olympic Winter Games, Innsbruck 1964	1964	Theo Hörmann		
900	100 Years of Olympic Films: 1912-2012	N/A	Tokyo Olympiad^{†}	1965	Kon Ichikawa	Japan	
900	100 Years of Olympic Films: 1912-2012	N/A	Sensation of the Century	1966	Taguchi Suketaro, Nobumasa Kawamoto	Japan	
900	100 Years of Olympic Films: 1912-2012	N/A	13 Days in France	1968	Claude Lelouch, François Reichenbach		
900	100 Years of Olympic Films: 1912-2012	N/A	Snows of Grenoble	1968	Jacques Ertaud, Jean-Jacques Languepin	France	
900	100 Years of Olympic Films: 1912-2012	N/A	The Olympics in Mexico	1969	Alberto Isaac	Mexico	
900	100 Years of Olympic Films: 1912-2012	N/A	Sapporo Winter Olympics	1972	Masahiro Shinoda	Japan	
900	100 Years of Olympic Films: 1912-2012	1081	Visions of Eight	1973	Miloš Forman, Kon Ichikawa, Claude Lelouch, Yuri Ozerov, Arthur Penn, Michael Pfleghar, John Schlesinger, Mai Zetterling	United States	Released individually after the release of the box set
900	100 Years of Olympic Films: 1912-2012	N/A	White Rock	1977	Tony Maylam	United Kingdom	
900	100 Years of Olympic Films: 1912-2012	N/A	Games of the XXI Olympiad	1977	Jean-Claude Labrecque, Jean Beaudin, Marcel Carrière, Georges Dufaux	Canada	
900	100 Years of Olympic Films: 1912-2012	N/A	Olympic Spirit	1980	Drummond Challis, Tony Maylam	United Kingdom	
900	100 Years of Olympic Films: 1912-2012	N/A	O Sport, You Are Peace!	1981	Yuri Ozerov	Russia	First Russian film in the collection (Note: Credited to the Russian Federation for country of origin by Criterion)
900	100 Years of Olympic Films: 1912-2012	N/A	A Turning Point	1984	Kim Takal		
900	100 Years of Olympic Films: 1912-2012	N/A	16 Days of Glory	1986	Bud Greenspan	United States	
900	100 Years of Olympic Films: 1912-2012	N/A	Calgary '88: 16 Days of Glory	1989	Bud Greenspan	United States	
900	100 Years of Olympic Films: 1912-2012	N/A	Seoul 1988	1989	Lee Kwang-soo	South Korea	
900	100 Years of Olympic Films: 1912-2012	N/A	Hand in Hand	1989	Im Kwon-taek	South Korea	
900	100 Years of Olympic Films: 1912-2012	N/A	Beyond All Barriers	1989	Lee Ji-won	South Korea	
900	100 Years of Olympic Films: 1912-2012	N/A	One Light, One World	1992	John Jay Jalbert, R. Douglas Copsey		
900	100 Years of Olympic Films: 1912-2012	N/A	Marathon	1993	Carlos Saura	Spain	
900	100 Years of Olympic Films: 1912-2012	N/A	Lillehammer '94: 16 Days of Glory	1996	Bud Greenspan	United States	
900	100 Years of Olympic Films: 1912-2012	N/A	Atlanta's Olympic Glory	1997	Bud Greenspan	United States	
900	100 Years of Olympic Films: 1912-2012	N/A	Nagano '98 Olympics: Stories of Honor and Glory	1998	Bud Greenspan	United States	
900	100 Years of Olympic Films: 1912-2012	N/A	Olympic Glory	1999	Kieth Merrill	United States	
900	100 Years of Olympic Films: 1912-2012	N/A	Sydney 2000: Stories of Olympic Glory	2001	Bud Greenspan	United States	
900	100 Years of Olympic Films: 1912-2012	N/A	Salt Lake City 2002: Bud Greenspan's Stories of Olympic Glory	2003	Bud Greenspan	United States	
900	100 Years of Olympic Films: 1912-2012	N/A	Bud Greenspan's Athens 2004: Stories of Olympic Glory	2005	Bud Greenspan	United States	
900	100 Years of Olympic Films: 1912-2012	N/A	Bud Greenspan's Torino 2006: Stories of Olympic Glory	2007	Bud Greenspan	United States	
900	100 Years of Olympic Films: 1912-2012	N/A	The Everlasting Flame	2010	Gu Jun		
900	100 Years of Olympic Films: 1912-2012	N/A	Bud Greenspan Presents Vancouver 2010: Stories of Olympic Glory	2010	Bud Greenspan, Nancy Beffa	Canada	
900	100 Years of Olympic Films: 1912-2012	N/A	First	2012	Caroline Rowland	United Kingdom	
930	Dietrich & von Sternberg in Hollywood	931	Morocco	1930	Josef von Sternberg	United States	
930	Dietrich & von Sternberg in Hollywood	932	Dishonored	1931	Josef von Sternberg	United States	
930	Dietrich & von Sternberg in Hollywood	933	Shanghai Express	1932	Josef von Sternberg	United States	
930	Dietrich & von Sternberg in Hollywood	934	Blonde Venus	1932	Josef von Sternberg	United States	
930	Dietrich & von Sternberg in Hollywood	109	The Scarlet Empress	1934	Josef von Sternberg	United States	Previously released individually
930	Dietrich & von Sternberg in Hollywood	935	The Devil Is a Woman	1935	Josef von Sternberg	United States	
N/A	Police Story/Police Story 2	971	Police Story	1985	Jackie Chan	Hong Kong	
N/A	Police Story/Police Story 2	972	Police Story 2	1988	Jackie Chan	Hong Kong	
N/A	The Koker Trilogy	990	Where Is the Friend's House?	1987	Abbas Kiarostami	Iran	
N/A	The Koker Trilogy	991	And Life Goes On	1992	Abbas Kiarostami	Iran	
N/A	The Koker Trilogy	992	Through the Olive Trees	1994	Abbas Kiarostami	Iran	
1000	Godzilla: The Showa-Era Films, 1954–1975	594	Godzilla	1954	Ishirō Honda	Japan	Previously released individually
1000	Godzilla: The Showa-Era Films, 1954–1975	N/A	Godzilla Raids Again	1955	Motoyoshi Oda	Japan	
1000	Godzilla: The Showa-Era Films, 1954–1975	N/A	King Kong vs. Godzilla	1963	Ishirō Honda	Japan	
1000	Godzilla: The Showa-Era Films, 1954–1975	N/A	Mothra vs. Godzilla	1964	Ishirō Honda	Japan	
1000	Godzilla: The Showa-Era Films, 1954–1975	N/A	Ghidorah, the Three-Headed Monster	1964	Ishirō Honda	Japan	
1000	Godzilla: The Showa-Era Films, 1954–1975	N/A	Invasion of Astro-Monster	1965	Ishirō Honda	Japan	
1000	Godzilla: The Showa-Era Films, 1954–1975	N/A	Ebirah, Horror of the Deep	1966	Jun Fukuda	Japan	
1000	Godzilla: The Showa-Era Films, 1954–1975	N/A	Son of Godzilla	1967	Jun Fukuda	Japan	
1000	Godzilla: The Showa-Era Films, 1954–1975	N/A	Destroy All Monsters	1968	Ishirō Honda	Japan	
1000	Godzilla: The Showa-Era Films, 1954–1975	N/A	All Monsters Attack	1969	Ishirō Honda	Japan	
1000	Godzilla: The Showa-Era Films, 1954–1975	N/A	Godzilla vs. Hedorah	1971	Yoshimitsu Banno	Japan	
1000	Godzilla: The Showa-Era Films, 1954–1975	N/A	Godzilla vs. Gigan	1972	Jun Fukuda	Japan	
1000	Godzilla: The Showa-Era Films, 1954–1975	N/A	Godzilla vs. Megalon	1973	Jun Fukuda	Japan	
1000	Godzilla: The Showa-Era Films, 1954–1975	N/A	Godzilla vs. Mechagodzilla	1974	Jun Fukuda	Japan	
1000	Godzilla: The Showa-Era Films, 1954–1975	N/A	Terror of Mechagodzilla	1975	Ishirō Honda	Japan	
N/A	Three Fantastic Journeys by Karel Zeman	1015	Journey to the Beginning of Time	1955	Karel Zeman	Czechoslovakia	
N/A	Three Fantastic Journeys by Karel Zeman	1016	Invention for Destruction	1958	Karel Zeman	Czechoslovakia	
N/A	Three Fantastic Journeys by Karel Zeman	1017	The Fabulous Baron Munchausen	1962	Karel Zeman	Czechoslovakia	
1030	Scorsese Shorts	N/A	Italianamerican	1974	Martin Scorsese	United States	
1030	Scorsese Shorts	N/A	American Boy	1978	Martin Scorsese	United States	
1030	Scorsese Shorts	N/A	The Big Shave	1967	Martin Scorsese	United States	
1030	Scorsese Shorts	N/A	It's Not Just You, Murray!	1964	Martin Scorsese	United States	
1030	Scorsese Shorts	N/A	What's a Nice Girl Like You Doing in a Place Like This?	1963	Martin Scorsese	United States	
1036	Bruce Lee: His Greatest Hits	N/A	The Big Boss	1971	Lo Wei	Hong Kong	
1036	Bruce Lee: His Greatest Hits	N/A	Fist of Fury	1972	Lo Wei	Hong Kong	
1036	Bruce Lee: His Greatest Hits	N/A	The Way of the Dragon	1972	Bruce Lee	Hong Kong	
1036	Bruce Lee: His Greatest Hits	N/A	Enter the Dragon	1973	Robert Clouse	Hong Kong	
1036	Bruce Lee: His Greatest Hits	N/A	Game of Death	1978	Robert Clouse	Hong Kong	
1044	Martin Scorsese's World Cinema Project No. 3	1045	Lucía	1968	Humberto Solás	Cuba	
1044	Martin Scorsese's World Cinema Project No. 3	1046	After the Curfew	1954	Usmar Ismail	Indonesia	First Indonesian film in the collection
1044	Martin Scorsese's World Cinema Project No. 3	1047	Pixote	1980	Héctor Babenco	Brazil	
1044	Martin Scorsese's World Cinema Project No. 3	1048	Dos monjes	1934	Juan Bustillo Oro	Mexico	
1044	Martin Scorsese's World Cinema Project No. 3	1049	Soleil Ô	1970	Med Hondo	France	
1044	Martin Scorsese's World Cinema Project No. 3	1050	Downpour	1972	Bahram Beyzai	Iran	
N/A	Streetwise/Tiny:The Life of Erin Blackwell	1079	Streetwise	1984	Martin Bell	United States	
N/A	Streetwise/Tiny:The Life of Erin Blackwell	1080	Tiny: The Life of Erin Blackwell	2016	Martin Bell	United States	
1082	The Signifyin’ Works of Marlon Riggs	N/A	Ethnic Notions	1986	Marlon Riggs	United States	
1082	The Signifyin’ Works of Marlon Riggs	N/A	Tongues Untied	1989	Marlon Riggs	United States	
1082	The Signifyin’ Works of Marlon Riggs	N/A	Affirmations	1990	Marlon Riggs	United States	
1082	The Signifyin’ Works of Marlon Riggs	N/A	Anthem	1991	Marlon Riggs	United States	
1082	The Signifyin’ Works of Marlon Riggs	N/A	Color Adjustment	1992	Marlon Riggs	United States	
1082	The Signifyin’ Works of Marlon Riggs	N/A	Non, Je Ne Regrette Rien (No Regret)	1993	Marlon Riggs	United States	
1082	The Signifyin’ Works of Marlon Riggs	N/A	Black Is...Black Ain't	1995	Marlon Riggs	United States	
1103	Once Upon a Time in China: The Complete Films	N/A	Once Upon a Time in China	1991	Tsui Hark	Hong Kong	
1103	Once Upon a Time in China: The Complete Films	N/A	Once Upon a Time in China II	1992	Tsui Hark	Hong Kong	
1103	Once Upon a Time in China: The Complete Films	N/A	Once Upon a Time in China III	1993	Tsui Hark	Hong Kong	
1103	Once Upon a Time in China: The Complete Films	N/A	Once Upon a Time in China IV	1993	Yuen Bun	Hong Kong	
1103	Once Upon a Time in China: The Complete Films	N/A	Once Upon a Time in China V	1994	Tsui Hark	Hong Kong	
1142	Martin Scorsese's World Cinema Project No. 4	1143	Sambizanga	1972	Sarah Maldoror	Angolia	First Angolan film in the collection
1142	Martin Scorsese's World Cinema Project No. 4	1144	Prisioneros de la tierra	1939	Mario Soffici	Argentina	
1142	Martin Scorsese's World Cinema Project No. 4	1145	Chess of the Wind	1976	Mohammad Resa Aslani	Iran	
1142	Martin Scorsese's World Cinema Project No. 4	1146	Muna Moto	1975	Jean-Pierre Dikongué Pipa	Cameroon	First Cameroonian film in the collection
1142	Martin Scorsese's World Cinema Project No. 4	1147	Two Girls on the Street	1939	Andre de Toth	Hungary	
1142	Martin Scorsese's World Cinema Project No. 4	1148	Kalpana	1948	Uday Shankar	India	
1159	The Infernal Affairs Trilogy	N/A	Infernal Affairs	2002	Andrew Lau Wai-Keung, Alan Mak	Hong Kong	
1159	The Infernal Affairs Trilogy	N/A	Infernal Affairs II	2003	Andrew Lau Wai-Keung, Alan Mak	Hong Kong	
1159	The Infernal Affairs Trilogy	N/A	Infernal Affairs III	2003	Andrew Lau Wai-Keung, Alan Mak	Hong Kong	
1162	Three Films by Mai Zetterling	N/A	Loving Couples	1964	Mai Zetterling	Sweden	
1162	Three Films by Mai Zetterling	N/A	Night Games	1966	Mai Zetterling	Sweden	
1162	Three Films by Mai Zetterling	N/A	The Girls	1968	Mai Zetterling	Sweden	
1163	Michael Haneke: Trilogy	N/A	The Seventh Continent	1989	Michael Haneke	Austria	
1163	Michael Haneke: Trilogy	N/A	Benny's Video	1992	Michael Haneke	Austria	
1163	Michael Haneke: Trilogy	N/A	71 Fragments of a Chronology of Chance	1994	Michael Haneke	Germany	
1168	Lars von Trier’s Europe Trilogy	80	The Element of Crime	1984	Lars von Trier	Denmark	
1168	Lars von Trier’s Europe Trilogy	N/A	Epidemic	1987	Lars von Trier	Denmark	
1168	Lars von Trier’s Europe Trilogy	454	Europa	1991	Lars von Trier	Denmark	Previously released individually
1172	Two Films by Marguerite Duras	N/A	India Song	1975	Marguerite Duras	France	
1172	Two Films by Marguerite Duras	N/A	Baxter, Vera Baxter	1977	Marguerite Duras	France	
1177	Small Axe	N/A	Mangrove	2020	Steve McQueen	United Kingdom	
1177	Small Axe	N/A	Lovers Rock	2020	Steve McQueen	United Kingdom	
1177	Small Axe	N/A	Red, White and Blue	2020	Steve McQueen	United Kingdom	
1177	Small Axe	N/A	Alex Wheatle	2020	Steve McQueen	United Kingdom	
1177	Small Axe	N/A	Education	2020	Steve McQueen	United Kingdom	
1186	The Ranown Westerns: Five Films Directed by Budd Boetticher	N/A	The Tall T	1957	Budd Boetticher	United States	
1186	The Ranown Westerns: Five Films Directed by Budd Boetticher	N/A	Decision at Sundown	1957	Budd Boetticher	United States	
1186	The Ranown Westerns: Five Films Directed by Budd Boetticher	N/A	Buchanan Rides Alone	1958	Budd Boetticher	United States	
1186	The Ranown Westerns: Five Films Directed by Budd Boetticher	N/A	Ride Lonesome	1959	Budd Boetticher	United States	
1186	The Ranown Westerns: Five Films Directed by Budd Boetticher	N/A	Comanche Station	1960	Budd Boetticher	United States	
1189	Bo Widerberg’s New Swedish Cinema	N/A	The Baby Carriage	1963	Bo Widerberg	Sweden	
1189	Bo Widerberg’s New Swedish Cinema	N/A	Raven's End	1963	Bo Widerberg	Sweden	
1189	Bo Widerberg’s New Swedish Cinema	N/A	Elvira Madigan	1967	Bo Widerberg	Sweden	
1189	Bo Widerberg’s New Swedish Cinema	N/A	Ådalen 31	1969	Bo Widerberg	Sweden	
1194	Freaks / The Unknown / The Mystic: Tod Browning’s Sideshow Shockers	N/A	Freaks	1932	Tod Browning	United States	
1194	Freaks / The Unknown / The Mystic: Tod Browning’s Sideshow Shockers	N/A	The Unknown	1927	Tod Browning	United States	
1194	Freaks / The Unknown / The Mystic: Tod Browning’s Sideshow Shockers	N/A	The Mystic	1925	Tod Browning	United States	
1197	Jackie Chan: Emergence of a Superstar	N/A	Half a Loaf of Kung Fu	1978	Chan Chi-hwa	Hong Kong	
1197	Jackie Chan: Emergence of a Superstar	N/A	Spiritual Kung Fu	1978	Lo Wei	Hong Kong	
1197	Jackie Chan: Emergence of a Superstar	N/A	The Fearless Hyena	1979	Jackie Chan	Hong Kong	
1197	Jackie Chan: Emergence of a Superstar	N/A	Fearless Hyena II	1983	Chan Chuen	Hong Kong	
1197	Jackie Chan: Emergence of a Superstar	N/A	The Young Master	1980	Jackie Chan	Hong Kong	
1197	Jackie Chan: Emergence of a Superstar	N/A	My Lucky Stars	1985	Sammo Hung	Hong Kong	
1200	The Red Balloon and Other Stories: Five Films by Albert Lamorisse	N/A	The Red Balloon^{†}	1956	Albert Lamorisse	France	
1200	The Red Balloon and Other Stories: Five Films by Albert Lamorisse	N/A	White Mane^{†}	1953	Albert Lamorisse	France	
1200	The Red Balloon and Other Stories: Five Films by Albert Lamorisse	N/A	Bim, the Little Donkey	1951	Albert Lamorisse	France	
1200	The Red Balloon and Other Stories: Five Films by Albert Lamorisse	N/A	Stowaway in the Sky	1960	Albert Lamorisse	France	
1200	The Red Balloon and Other Stories: Five Films by Albert Lamorisse	N/A	Circus Angel	1965	Albert Lamorisse	France	
1203	Chantal Akerman Masterpieces, 1968–1978	N/A	Saute ma ville	1968	Chantal Akerman	Belgium	
1203	Chantal Akerman Masterpieces, 1968–1978	N/A	L’enfant aimé ou Je joue à être une femme mariée	1971	Chantal Akerman	Belgium	
1203	Chantal Akerman Masterpieces, 1968–1978	N/A	La Chambre	1972	Chantal Akerman	United States	Previously released as a part of the Eclipse series
1203	Chantal Akerman Masterpieces, 1968–1978	N/A	Hotel Monterey	1972	Chantal Akerman	United States	Previously released as a part of the Eclipse series
1203	Chantal Akerman Masterpieces, 1968–1978	N/A	Le 15/8	1973	Chantal Akerman	Belgium	
1203	Chantal Akerman Masterpieces, 1968–1978	N/A	Je Tu Il Elle	1975	Chantal Akerman	Belgium	Previously released as a part of the Eclipse series
1203	Chantal Akerman Masterpieces, 1968–1978	484	Jeanne Dielman, 23 quai du Commerce, 1080 Bruxelles	1975	Chantal Akerman	France	Previously released as a part of the Eclipse series
1203	Chantal Akerman Masterpieces, 1968–1978	N/A	News from Home	1976	Chantal Akerman	France	Previously released as a part of the Eclipse series
1203	Chantal Akerman Masterpieces, 1968–1978	N/A	Les Rendez-vous d'Anna	1978	Chantal Akerman	France	Previously released as a part of the Eclipse series
1206	Eric Rohmer’s Tales of the Four Seasons	N/A	A Tale of Winter	1990	Éric Rohmer	France	
1206	Eric Rohmer’s Tales of the Four Seasons	N/A	A Tale of Spring	1992	Éric Rohmer	France	
1206	Eric Rohmer’s Tales of the Four Seasons	N/A	A Tale of Summer	1996	Éric Rohmer	France	
1206	Eric Rohmer’s Tales of the Four Seasons	N/A	A Tale of Autumn	1998	Éric Rohmer	France	
1207	The Heroic Trio / Executioners	N/A	The Heroic Trio	1993	Johnnie To	Hong Kong	
1207	The Heroic Trio / Executioners	N/A	Executioners	1993	Johnnie To, Ching Siu-Tung	Hong Kong	
1217	Three Revolutionary Films by Ousmane Sembène	N/A	Emitaï	1971	Ousmane Sembène	Senegal	
1217	Three Revolutionary Films by Ousmane Sembène	N/A	Xala	1975	Ousmane Sembène	Senegal	
1217	Three Revolutionary Films by Ousmane Sembène	N/A	Ceddo	1977	Ousmane Sembène	Senegal	
1229	Brief Encounters / The Long Farewell: Two Films by Kira Muratova	N/A	Brief Encounters	1967	Kira Muratova	Ukraine	
1229	Brief Encounters / The Long Farewell: Two Films by Kira Muratova	N/A	The Long Farewell	1971	Kira Muratova	Ukraine	
1233	Gregg Araki’s Teen Apocalypse Trilogy	N/A	Totally F***ed Up	1993	Gregg Araki	United States	
1233	Gregg Araki’s Teen Apocalypse Trilogy	N/A	The Doom Generation	1995	Gregg Araki	United States	
1233	Gregg Araki’s Teen Apocalypse Trilogy	N/A	Nowhere	1997	Gregg Araki	United States	
1236	I Walked with a Zombie / The Seventh Victim: Produced by Val Lewton	N/A	I Walked with a Zombie	1943	Jacques Tourneur	United States	
1236	I Walked with a Zombie / The Seventh Victim: Produced by Val Lewton	N/A	The Seventh Victim	1943	Mark Robson	United States	
1257	Jean de Florette / Manon of the Spring: Two Films by Claude Berri	N/A	Jean de Florette	1986	Claude Berri	France	
1257	Jean de Florette / Manon of the Spring: Two Films by Claude Berri	N/A	Manon of the Spring	1986	Claude Berri	France	
1263	The Three Musketeers / The Four Musketeers: Two Films by Richard Lester	N/A	The Three Musketeers	1973	Richard Lester	United Kingdom	
1263	The Three Musketeers / The Four Musketeers: Two Films by Richard Lester	N/A	The Four Musketeers	1974	Richard Lester	United Kingdom	
1275	A Confucian Confusion / Mahjong: Two Films by Edward Yang	N/A	A Confucian Confusion	1994	Edward Yang	Taiwan	
1275	A Confucian Confusion / Mahjong: Two Films by Edward Yang	N/A	Mahjong	1996	Edward Yang	Taiwan	
1291	Return to Reason: Four Films by Man Ray	N/A	Le Retour à la Raison	1923	Man Ray	France	
1291	Return to Reason: Four Films by Man Ray	N/A	Emak Bakia	1926	Man Ray	France	
1291	Return to Reason: Four Films by Man Ray	N/A	L'Étoile de mer	1928	Man Ray	France	
1291	Return to Reason: Four Films by Man Ray	N/A	Les Mystères du Château du Dé	1929	Man Ray	France	
1296	Martin Scorsese’s World Cinema Project No. 5	N/A	Chronicle of the Years of Fire	1975	Mohammed Lakhdar-Hamina	Algeria	First Algerian film in the collection
1296	Martin Scorsese’s World Cinema Project No. 5	N/A	Yam Daabo	1987	Idrissa Ouédraogo	Burkina Faso	First Burkinabé film in the collection
1296	Martin Scorsese’s World Cinema Project No. 5	N/A	Kummatty	1979	G. Aravindan	India	
1296	Martin Scorsese’s World Cinema Project No. 5	N/A	The Fall of Otrar	1991	Ardak Amirkulov	Kazakhstan	
1307	John Singleton’s Hood Trilogy	N/A	Boyz n the Hood^{†} (Note: Released on LaserDisc as spine #150)	1991	John Singleton	United States	
1307	John Singleton’s Hood Trilogy	N/A	Poetic Justice	1993	John Singleton	United States	
1307	John Singleton’s Hood Trilogy	N/A	Baby Boy	2001	John Singleton	United States	
1322	I’ll Remind You of Everything: The Films of Mike Mills	N/A	Beginners	2010	Mike Mills	United States	
1322	I’ll Remind You of Everything: The Films of Mike Mills	N/A	20th Century Women	2016	Mike Mills	United States	
1322	I’ll Remind You of Everything: The Films of Mike Mills	N/A	C'mon C'mon	2021	Mike Mills	United States	
1326	Three Films by Leos Carax	N/A	Boy Meets Girl	1984	Leos Carax	France	
1326	Three Films by Leos Carax	N/A	Mauvais Sang	1986	Leos Carax	France	
1326	Three Films by Leos Carax	N/A	The Lovers on the Bridge	1991	Leos Carax	France	
1341	Martin Scorsese’s World Cinema Project No. 6	N/A	Mortu Nega	1988	Flora Gomes	Guinea-Bissau	First Bissau-Guinean film in the collection
1341	Martin Scorsese’s World Cinema Project No. 6	N/A	São Paulo, Incorporated	1965	Luiz Sérgio Person	Brazil	
1341	Martin Scorsese’s World Cinema Project No. 6	N/A	The Woman with the Knife	1969	Timité Bassori	Ivory Coast	First Ivorian film in the collection
1341	Martin Scorsese’s World Cinema Project No. 6	N/A	The Stranger and the Fog	1974	Bahram Beyzaie	Iran	Previously released individually
1345	Victor Sjöström’s Hollywood Masterworks	N/A	He Who Gets Slapped	1924	Victor Sjöström	United States	Previously released individually
1345	Victor Sjöström’s Hollywood Masterworks	N/A	The Scarlet Letter	1926	Victor Sjöström	United States	Previously released individually
1345	Victor Sjöström’s Hollywood Masterworks	N/A	The Wind	1928	Victor Sjöström	United States	Previously released individually
N/A	Essential Art House: 50 Years of Janus Films	56	The 39 Steps	1935	Alfred Hitchcock	United Kingdom	Previously released individually
N/A	Essential Art House: 50 Years of Janus Films	5	The 400 Blows^{†}	1959	François Truffaut	France	Previously released individually
N/A	Essential Art House: 50 Years of Janus Films	87	Alexander Nevsky	1938	Sergei Eisenstein	Soviet Union	Previously released individually
N/A	Essential Art House: 50 Years of Janus Films	285	Ashes and Diamonds^{†}	1958	Andrzej Wajda	Poland	Previously released individually
N/A	Essential Art House: 50 Years of Janus Films	148	Ballad of a Soldier	1959	Grigory Chukhray	Soviet Union	Previously released individually
N/A	Essential Art House: 50 Years of Janus Films	6	Beauty and the Beast^{†}	1946	Jean Cocteau	France	Previously released individually
N/A	Essential Art House: 50 Years of Janus Films	48	Black Orpheus^{†}	1959	Marcel Camus	France	Previously released individually
N/A	Essential Art House: 50 Years of Janus Films	76	Brief Encounter^{†}	1945	David Lean	United Kingdom	Previously released individually
N/A	Essential Art House: 50 Years of Janus Films	357	The Fallen Idol^{†}	1948	Carol Reed	United Kingdom	Previously released individually
N/A	Essential Art House: 50 Years of Janus Films	378	Fires on the Plain^{†}	1959	Kon Ichikawa	Japan	Previously released individually
N/A	Essential Art House: 50 Years of Janus Films	333	Fists in the Pocket	1965	Marco Bellocchio	Italy	Previously released individually
N/A	Essential Art House: 50 Years of Janus Films	232	Floating Weeds^{†}	1959	Yasujirō Ozu	Japan	Previously released individually
N/A	Essential Art House: 50 Years of Janus Films	318	Forbidden Games^{†}	1952	René Clément	France	Previously released individually
N/A	Essential Art House: 50 Years of Janus Films	1	Grand Illusion	1937	Jean Renoir	France	Previously released individually
N/A	Essential Art House: 50 Years of Janus Films	134	Häxan	1922	Benjamin Christensen	Denmark	Previously released individually
N/A	Essential Art House: 50 Years of Janus Films	221	Ikiru^{†}	1952	Akira Kurosawa	Japan	Previously released individually
N/A	Essential Art House: 50 Years of Janus Films	194	Il Posto	1961	Ermanno Olmi	Italy	Previously released individually
N/A	Essential Art House: 50 Years of Janus Films	158	The Importance of Being Earnest^{†}	1952	Anthony Asquith	United Kingdom	Previously released individually
N/A	Essential Art House: 50 Years of Janus Films	88	Ivan the Terrible, Part II	1958	Sergei Eisenstein	Soviet Union	Previously released individually
N/A	Essential Art House: 50 Years of Janus Films	N/A	Le Jour se Lève	1939	Marcel Carné	France	
N/A	Essential Art House: 50 Years of Janus Films	281	Jules and Jim^{†}	1962	François Truffaut	France	Previously released individually
N/A	Essential Art House: 50 Years of Janus Films	325	Kind Hearts and Coronets	1949	Robert Hamer	United Kingdom	Previously released individually
N/A	Essential Art House: 50 Years of Janus Films	215	Knife in the Water^{†}	1962	Roman Polanski	Poland	Previously released individually
N/A	Essential Art House: 50 Years of Janus Films	3	The Lady Vanishes^{†}	1938	Alfred Hitchcock	United Kingdom	Previously released individually
N/A	Essential Art House: 50 Years of Janus Films	173	The Life and Death of Colonel Blimp^{†}	1943	Michael Powell, Emeric Pressburger	United Kingdom	Previously released individually
N/A	Essential Art House: 50 Years of Janus Films	144	Loves of a Blonde	1965	Miloš Forman	Czechoslovakia	Previously released individually
N/A	Essential Art House: 50 Years of Janus Films	98	L'Avventura^{†}	1960	Michelangelo Antonioni	Italy	Previously released individually
N/A	Essential Art House: 50 Years of Janus Films	30	M^{†}	1931	Fritz Lang	Germany	Previously released individually
N/A	Essential Art House: 50 Years of Janus Films	110	Monsieur Hulot's Holiday^{†}	1953	Jacques Tati	France	Previously released individually
N/A	Essential Art House: 50 Years of Janus Films	416	Miss Julie	1951	Alf Sjöberg	Sweden	Previously released individually
N/A	Essential Art House: 50 Years of Janus Films	358	Pandora's Box	1929	G.W. Pabst	Germany	Previously released individually
N/A	Essential Art House: 50 Years of Janus Films	172	Pépé le moko	1937	Julien Duvivier	France	Previously released individually
N/A	Essential Art House: 50 Years of Janus Films	85	Pygmalion^{†}	1938	Anthony Asquith, Leslie Howard	United Kingdom	Previously released individually
N/A	Essential Art House: 50 Years of Janus Films	138	Rashomon^{†}	1950	Akira Kurosawa	Japan	Previously released individually
N/A	Essential Art House: 50 Years of Janus Films	213	Richard III^{†}	1955	Laurence Olivier	United Kingdom	Previously released individually
N/A	Essential Art House: 50 Years of Janus Films	216	The Rules of the Game^{†}	1939	Jean Renoir	France	Previously released individually
N/A	Essential Art House: 50 Years of Janus Films	2	Seven Samurai^{†}	1954	Akira Kurosawa	Japan	Previously released individually
N/A	Essential Art House: 50 Years of Janus Films	11	The Seventh Seal^{†}	1957	Ingmar Bergman	Sweden	Previously released individually
N/A	Essential Art House: 50 Years of Janus Films	351	The Spirit of the Beehive	1973	Víctor Erice	Spain	Previously released individually
N/A	Essential Art House: 50 Years of Janus Films	219	La Strada^{†}	1954	Federico Fellini	Italy	Previously released individually
N/A	Essential Art House: 50 Years of Janus Films	22	Summertime^{†}	1955	David Lean	United States	Previously released individually
N/A	Essential Art House: 50 Years of Janus Films	64	The Third Man^{†}	1949	Carol Reed	United Kingdom	Previously released individually
N/A	Essential Art House: 50 Years of Janus Films	N/A	The Great Chase	1962	Saul J. Turell	United States	
N/A	Essential Art House: 50 Years of Janus Films	N/A	The Love Goddess	1962	Saul J. Turell	United States	
N/A	Essential Art House: 50 Years of Janus Films	N/A	Paul Robeson: Tribute to an Artist	1979	Saul J. Turell	United States	Previously released in a box set
N/A	Essential Art House: 50 Years of Janus Films	309	Ugetsu^{†}	1953	Kenji Mizoguchi	Japan	Previously released individually
N/A	Essential Art House: 50 Years of Janus Films	201	Umberto D.^{†}	1952	Vittorio De Sica	Italy	Previously released individually
N/A	Essential Art House: 50 Years of Janus Films	321	The Virgin Spring^{†}	1960	Ingmar Bergman	Sweden	Previously released individually
N/A	Essential Art House: 50 Years of Janus Films	332	Viridiana	1961	Luis Buñuel	Spain	Previously released individually
N/A	Essential Art House: 50 Years of Janus Films	36	The Wages of Fear^{†}	1953	Henri-Georges Clouzot	France	Previously released individually
N/A	Essential Art House: 50 Years of Janus Films	189	The White Sheik	1952	Federico Fellini	Italy	Previously released individually
N/A	Essential Art House: 50 Years of Janus Films	139	Wild Strawberries^{†}	1957	Ingmar Bergman	Sweden	Previously released individually

== List of films in director box sets ==
The Criterion Collection has released several box sets for notable film directors, often encompassing their entire filmography or most notable works. The box sets on this list only include box sets which contain films not previously released individually. Sets such as The Wes Anderson Archive, for instance, are composed fully of films already released individually by the collection. Box sets do not have designated spine numbers, nor do the newly-released films included in them.

† Released on LaserDisc and DVD

Name of box set	Spine number (of film)	Included films	Year	Director	Notes
Ingmar Bergman's Cinema	N/A	Crisis	1946	Ingmar Bergman	Previously released as a part of the Eclipse series
Ingmar Bergman's Cinema	N/A	A Ship to India	1947	Ingmar Bergman	
Ingmar Bergman's Cinema	N/A	Port of Call	1948	Ingmar Bergman	Previously released as a part of the Eclipse series
Ingmar Bergman's Cinema	N/A	Thirst	1949	Ingmar Bergman	
Ingmar Bergman's Cinema	N/A	To Joy	1950	Ingmar Bergman	Previously released as a part of the Eclipse series
Ingmar Bergman's Cinema	613	Summer Interlude	1951	Ingmar Bergman	Previously released individually
Ingmar Bergman's Cinema	N/A	Waiting Women	1952	Ingmar Bergman	
Ingmar Bergman's Cinema	N/A	Sawdust and Tinsel	1953	Ingmar Bergman	
Ingmar Bergman's Cinema	N/A	A Lesson in Love	1954	Ingmar Bergman	
Ingmar Bergman's Cinema	N/A	Dreams	1955	Ingmar Bergman	
Ingmar Bergman's Cinema	N/A	Smiles of a Summer Night^{†}	1955	Ingmar Bergman	
Ingmar Bergman's Cinema	11	The Seventh Seal^{†}	1957	Ingmar Bergman	Previously released individually
Ingmar Bergman's Cinema	139	Wild Strawberries^{†}	1957	Ingmar Bergman	Previously released individually
Ingmar Bergman's Cinema	N/A	Brink of Life	1958	Ingmar Bergman	
Ingmar Bergman's Cinema	N/A	The Magician^{†}	1958	Ingmar Bergman	
Ingmar Bergman's Cinema	N/A	The Virgin Spring^{†}	1960	Ingmar Bergman	
Ingmar Bergman's Cinema	N/A	The Devil's Eye	1960	Ingmar Bergman	
Ingmar Bergman's Cinema	209	Through a Glass Darkly^{†}	1961	Ingmar Bergman	Previously released in a box set
Ingmar Bergman's Cinema	210	Winter Light^{†}	1963	Ingmar Bergman	Previously released in a box set
Ingmar Bergman's Cinema	211	The Silence^{†}	1963	Ingmar Bergman	Previously released in a box set
Ingmar Bergman's Cinema	N/A	All These Women	1964	Ingmar Bergman	
Ingmar Bergman's Cinema	701	Persona	1966	Ingmar Bergman	
Ingmar Bergman's Cinema	N/A	Hour of the Wolf	1968	Ingmar Bergman	
Ingmar Bergman's Cinema	961	Shame	1968	Ingmar Bergman	Previously released individually
Ingmar Bergman's Cinema	N/A	The Rite	1969	Ingmar Bergman	
Ingmar Bergman's Cinema	N/A	The Passion of Anna	1969	Ingmar Bergman	
Ingmar Bergman's Cinema	N/A	Fårö Document	1970	Ingmar Bergman	
Ingmar Bergman's Cinema	N/A	The Touch	1971	Ingmar Bergman	
Ingmar Bergman's Cinema	N/A	Cries and Whispers^{†} (Note: Released on LaserDisc as Spine #207)	1972	Ingmar Bergman	
Ingmar Bergman's Cinema	229	Scenes from a Marriage^{†}	1973	Ingmar Bergman	Previously released individually
Ingmar Bergman's Cinema	N/A	The Magic Flute^{†}	1975	Ingmar Bergman	
Ingmar Bergman's Cinema	N/A	The Serpent's Egg	1977	Ingmar Bergman	
Ingmar Bergman's Cinema	60	Autumn Sonata^{†}	1978	Ingmar Bergman	
Ingmar Bergman's Cinema	N/A	Fårö Document 1979	1979	Ingmar Bergman	
Ingmar Bergman's Cinema	N/A	From the Life of the Marionettes	1980	Ingmar Bergman	
Ingmar Bergman's Cinema	262	Fanny and Alexander: Theatrical Version	1982	Ingmar Bergman	Previously released in a box set
Ingmar Bergman's Cinema	263	Fanny and Alexander: Television Version	1983	Ingmar Bergman	Previously released in a box set
Ingmar Bergman's Cinema	N/A	After the Rehearsal	1984	Ingmar Bergman	
Ingmar Bergman's Cinema	N/A	Saraband	2003	Ingmar Bergman	
The Complete Films of Agnès Varda	N/A	Varda by Agnès	2019	Agnès Varda	
The Complete Films of Agnès Varda	419	La Pointe Courte	1955	Agnès Varda	Previously released individually
The Complete Films of Agnès Varda	73	Cléo from 5 to 7^{†}	1962	Agnès Varda	Previously released individually
The Complete Films of Agnès Varda	N/A	Daguerréotypes	1975	Agnès Varda	
The Complete Films of Agnès Varda	420	Le Bonheur	1965	Agnès Varda	Previously released individually
The Complete Films of Agnès Varda	N/A	Les Créatures	1966	Agnès Varda	
The Complete Films of Agnès Varda	N/A	Uncle Yanco	1968	Agnès Varda	Previously released in the Eclipse series
The Complete Films of Agnès Varda	N/A	Black Panthers	1970	Agnès Varda	Previously released in the Eclipse series
The Complete Films of Agnès Varda	N/A	Lions Love (... and Lies)	1969	Agnès Varda	Previously released in the Eclipse series
The Complete Films of Agnès Varda	N/A	Mur Murs	1981	Agnès Varda	Previously released in the Eclipse series
The Complete Films of Agnès Varda	N/A	Documenteur	1981	Agnès Varda	Previously released in the Eclipse series
The Complete Films of Agnès Varda	978	One Sings, the Other Doesn’t	1977	Agnès Varda	Previously released individually
The Complete Films of Agnès Varda	74	Vagabond^{†}	1985	Agnès Varda	Previously released individually
The Complete Films of Agnès Varda	N/A	Jane B. par Agnès V.	1988	Agnès Varda	
The Complete Films of Agnès Varda	N/A	Kung-Fu Master!	1988	Agnès Varda	
The Complete Films of Agnès Varda	N/A	Jacquot de Nantes	1991	Agnès Varda	
The Complete Films of Agnès Varda	N/A	One Hundred and One Nights	1995	Agnès Varda	
The Complete Films of Agnès Varda	N/A	The Gleaners and I	2000	Agnès Varda	
The Complete Films of Agnès Varda	N/A	The Gleaners and I: Two Years Later	2002	Agnès Varda	
The Complete Films of Agnès Varda	N/A	Faces Places	2017	Agnès Varda	
The Complete Films of Agnès Varda	N/A	Agnès de ci de là Varda	2011	Agnès Varda	
The Complete Films of Agnès Varda	N/A	The Beaches of Agnès	2008	Agnès Varda	
Essential Fellini	81	Variety Lights	1950	Federico Fellini	Previously released individually
Essential Fellini	189	The White Sheik	1952	Federico Fellini	Previously released individually
Essential Fellini	246	I Vitelloni	1953	Federico Fellini	Previously released individually
Essential Fellini	219	La Strada^{†}	1954	Federico Fellini	Previously released individually
Essential Fellini	N/A	Il Bidone	1955	Federico Fellini	
Essential Fellini	49	Nights of Cabiria	1957	Federico Fellini	Previously released individually
Essential Fellini	733	La Dolce Vita	1960	Federico Fellini	Previously released individually
Essential Fellini	140	8½^{†}	1963	Federico Fellini	Previously released individually
Essential Fellini	149	Juliet of the Spirits	1965	Federico Fellini	Previously released individually
Essential Fellini	747	Fellini Satyricon^{†}	1969	Federico Fellini	Previously released individually
Essential Fellini	848	Roma	1972	Federico Fellini	Previously released individually
Essential Fellini	4	Amarcord^{†}	1973	Federico Fellini	Previously released individually
Essential Fellini	50	And the Ship Sails On	1983	Federico Fellini	Previously released individually
Essential Fellini	N/A	Intervista	1987	Federico Fellini	
World of Wong Kar Wai	N/A	As Tears Go By	1988	Wong Kar-wai	
World of Wong Kar Wai	N/A	Days of Being Wild	1990	Wong Kar-wai	
World of Wong Kar Wai	453	Chungking Express	1994	Wong Kar-wai	Previously released individually
World of Wong Kar Wai	N/A	Fallen Angels	1995	Wong Kar-wai	
World of Wong Kar Wai	N/A	Happy Together	1997	Wong Kar-wai	
World of Wong Kar Wai	147	In the Mood for Love	2000	Wong Kar-wai	Previously released individually
World of Wong Kar Wai	N/A	2046	2004	Wong Kar-wai	
AK 100: 25 Films by Akira Kurosawa	N/A	Sanshiro Sugata	1943		Previously released in the Eclipse series
AK 100: 25 Films by Akira Kurosawa	N/A	The Most Beautiful	1944		Previously released in the Eclipse series
AK 100: 25 Films by Akira Kurosawa	N/A	Sanshiro Sugata, Part Two	1945		Previously released in the Eclipse series
AK 100: 25 Films by Akira Kurosawa	N/A	The Men Who Tread on the Tiger's Tail	1945		Previously released in the Eclipse series
AK 100: 25 Films by Akira Kurosawa	N/A	No Regrets for Our Youth	1946		Previously released in the Eclipse series
AK 100: 25 Films by Akira Kurosawa	N/A	One Wonderful Sunday	1947		Previously released in the Eclipse series
AK 100: 25 Films by Akira Kurosawa	N/A	Drunken Angel	1948		Previously released individually
AK 100: 25 Films by Akira Kurosawa	233	Stray Dog^{†}	1949		Previously released individually
AK 100: 25 Films by Akira Kurosawa	N/A	Scandal	1950		Previously released in the Eclipse series
AK 100: 25 Films by Akira Kurosawa	138	Rashomon^{†}	1950		Previously released individually
AK 100: 25 Films by Akira Kurosawa	N/A	The Idiot	1951		Previously released in the Eclipse series
AK 100: 25 Films by Akira Kurosawa	221	Ikiru^{†}	1952		Previously released individually
AK 100: 25 Films by Akira Kurosawa	2	Seven Samurai^{†}	1954		Previously released individually
AK 100: 25 Films by Akira Kurosawa	N/A	I Live in Fear	1955		Previously released in the Eclipse series
AK 100: 25 Films by Akira Kurosawa	190	Throne of Blood^{†}	1957		Previously released individually
AK 100: 25 Films by Akira Kurosawa	239	The Lower Depths	1957		Previously released individually
AK 100: 25 Films by Akira Kurosawa	116	The Hidden Fortress^{†}	1958		Previously released individually
AK 100: 25 Films by Akira Kurosawa	319	The Bad Sleep Well^{†}	1960		Previously released individually
AK 100: 25 Films by Akira Kurosawa	52	Yojimbo^{†}	1961		Previously released individually
AK 100: 25 Films by Akira Kurosawa	53	Sanjuro^{†}	1962		Previously released individually
AK 100: 25 Films by Akira Kurosawa	24	High and Low^{†}	1963		Previously released individually
AK 100: 25 Films by Akira Kurosawa	159	Red Beard^{†}	1965		Previously released individually
AK 100: 25 Films by Akira Kurosawa	465	Dodes'ka-den^{†}	1970		Previously released individually
AK 100: 25 Films by Akira Kurosawa	267	Kagemusha	1980		Previously released individually
AK 100: 25 Films by Akira Kurosawa	N/A	Madadayo	1993		
Pasolini 101	N/A	Accattone	1961	Pier Paolo Pasolini	
Pasolini 101	236	Mamma Roma	1962	Pier Paolo Pasolini	Previously released individually
Pasolini 101	N/A	Love Meetings	1964	Pier Paolo Pasolini	
Pasolini 101	N/A	The Gospel According to Matthew	1964	Pier Paolo Pasolini	
Pasolini 101	N/A	The Hawks and the Sparrows	1966	Pier Paolo Pasolini	
Pasolini 101	N/A	Oedipus Rex	1967	Pier Paolo Pasolini	
Pasolini 101	1013	Teorema	1968	Pier Paolo Pasolini	Previously released individually
Pasolini 101	N/A	Porcile	1969	Pier Paolo Pasolini	
Pasolini 101	N/A	Medea	1969	Pier Paolo Pasolini	
The Complete Kubrick	N/A	Killer's Kiss	1955	Stanley Kubrick	
The Complete Kubrick	575	The Killing	1956	Stanley Kubrick	Previously released individually
The Complete Kubrick	538	Paths of Glory^{†}	1957	Stanley Kubrick	Previously released individually
The Complete Kubrick	105	Spartacus^{†}	1960	Stanley Kubrick	Previously released individually
The Complete Kubrick	N/A	Lolita^{†} (Note: Released on LaserDisc as Spine #103)	1962	Stanley Kubrick	
The Complete Kubrick	821	Dr. Strangelove, or: How I Learned to Stop Worrying and Love the Bomb^{†}	1964	Stanley Kubrick	Previously released individually
The Complete Kubrick	N/A	2001: A Space Odyssey^{†} (Note: Released on LaserDisc as spine #60)	1968	Stanley Kubrick	
The Complete Kubrick	N/A	A Clockwork Orange	1971	Stanley Kubrick	
The Complete Kubrick	897	Barry Lyndon	1975	Stanley Kubrick	Previously released individually
The Complete Kubrick	N/A	The Shining	1980	Stanley Kubrick	
The Complete Kubrick	N/A	Full Metal Jacket	1987	Stanley Kubrick	
The Complete Kubrick	1290	Eyes Wide Shut	1999	Stanley Kubrick	Previously released individually

== List of films in the Eclipse series ==
The Criterion Collection's Eclipse series "presents a selection of lost, forgotten, or overshadowed films in simple, affordable editions"." The films in Eclipse do not have spine numbers, with each release being designated its own number in the series.

† Released on LaserDisc and DVD

Series	Name of Eclipse series	Included Films	Year	Director
1	Early Bergman	Torment	1944	Alf Sjöberg
1	Early Bergman	Crisis	1946	Ingmar Bergman
1	Early Bergman	Port of Call	1948	Ingmar Bergman
1	Early Bergman	To Joy	1950	Ingmar Bergman
2	The Documentaries of Louis Malle	Vive le Tour	1962	Louis Malle
2	The Documentaries of Louis Malle	Humain, trop humain	1973	Louis Malle
2	The Documentaries of Louis Malle	Place de la République	1974	Louis Malle
2	The Documentaries of Louis Malle	Phantom India	1969	Louis Malle
2	The Documentaries of Louis Malle	Calcutta	1969	Louis Malle
2	The Documentaries of Louis Malle	God's Country	1985	Louis Malle
2	The Documentaries of Louis Malle	. . . And the Pursuit of Happiness	1986	Louis Malle
3	Late Ozu	Early Spring	1956	Yasujirō Ozu
3	Late Ozu	Tokyo Twilight	1957	Yasujirō Ozu
3	Late Ozu	Equinox Flower	1958	Yasujirō Ozu
3	Late Ozu	Late Autumn	1960	Yasujirō Ozu
3	Late Ozu	The End of Summer	1961	Yasujirō Ozu
4	Raymond Bernard	Wooden Crosses	1932	Raymond Bernard
4	Raymond Bernard	Les Misérables	1934	Raymond Bernard
5	The First Films of Samuel Fuller	I Shot Jesse James	1949	Samuel Fuller
5	The First Films of Samuel Fuller	The Baron of Arizona	1950	Samuel Fuller
5	The First Films of Samuel Fuller	The Steel Helmet	1951	Samuel Fuller
6	Carlos Saura's Flamenco Trilogy	Blood Wedding	1981	Carlos Saura
6	Carlos Saura's Flamenco Trilogy	Carmen	1983	Carlos Saura
6	Carlos Saura's Flamenco Trilogy	El amor brujo	1986	Carlos Saura
7	Postwar Kurosawa	No Regrets for Our Youth	1946	Akira Kurosawa
7	Postwar Kurosawa	One Wonderful Sunday	1947	Akira Kurosawa
7	Postwar Kurosawa	Scandal	1950	Akira Kurosawa
7	Postwar Kurosawa	The Idiot	1951	Akira Kurosawa
7	Postwar Kurosawa	I Live in Fear	1955	Akira Kurosawa
8	Lubitsch Musicals	The Love Parade	1929	Ernst Lubitsch
8	Lubitsch Musicals	Monte Carlo	1930	Ernst Lubitsch
8	Lubitsch Musicals	The Smiling Lieutenant	1931	Ernst Lubitsch
8	Lubitsch Musicals	One Hour with You	1932	Ernst Lubitsch
9	The Delirious Fictions of William Klein	Who Are You, Polly Maggoo?	1966	William Klein
9	The Delirious Fictions of William Klein	Mr. Freedom	1969	William Klein
9	The Delirious Fictions of William Klein	The Model Couple	1977	William Klein
10	Silent Ozu - Three Family Comedies	Tokyo Chorus	1931	Yasujirō Ozu
10	Silent Ozu - Three Family Comedies	I Was Born, But...	1932	Yasujirō Ozu
10	Silent Ozu - Three Family Comedies	Passing Fancy	1933	Yasujirō Ozu
11	Larisa Shepitko	Wings	1966	Larisa Shepitko
12	Aki Kaurismäki’s Proletariat Trilogy	Shadows in Paradise	1986	Aki Kaurismäki
12	Aki Kaurismäki’s Proletariat Trilogy	Ariel	1988	Aki Kaurismäki
12	Aki Kaurismäki’s Proletariat Trilogy	The Match Factory Girl	1990	Aki Kaurismäki
13	Kenji Mizoguchi's Fallen Women	Osaka Elegy^{†} (Note: Released on LaserDisc as Spine #221)	1936	Kenji Mizoguchi
13	Kenji Mizoguchi's Fallen Women	Sisters of the Gion	1936	Kenji Mizoguchi
13	Kenji Mizoguchi's Fallen Women	Women of the Night	1948	Kenji Mizoguchi
13	Kenji Mizoguchi's Fallen Women	Street of Shame	1956	Kenji Mizoguchi
14	Rossellini's History Films - Renaissance and Enlightenment	The Age of the Medici	1973	Roberto Rossellini
14	Rossellini's History Films - Renaissance and Enlightenment	Cartesius	1974	Roberto Rossellini
14	Rossellini's History Films - Renaissance and Enlightenment	Blaise Pascal	1972	Roberto Rossellini
15	Travels with Hiroshi Shimizu	Japanese Girls at the Harbor	1933	Hiroshi Shimizu
15	Travels with Hiroshi Shimizu	Mr. Thank You	1936	Hiroshi Shimizu
15	Travels with Hiroshi Shimizu	The Masseurs and a Woman	1938	Hiroshi Shimizu
15	Travels with Hiroshi Shimizu	Ornamental Hairpin	1941	Hiroshi Shimizu
16	Alexander Korda's Private Lives	The Private Life of Henry VIII	1933	Alexander Korda
16	Alexander Korda's Private Lives	The Private Life of Catherine the Great	1934	Alexander Korda
16	Alexander Korda's Private Lives	The Private Life of Don Juan	1934	Alexander Korda
16	Alexander Korda's Private Lives	Rembrandt	1936	Alexander Korda
17	Nikkatsu Noir	I Am Waiting	1957	Koreyoshi Kurahara
17	Nikkatsu Noir	Rusty Knife	1958	Toshio Masuda
17	Nikkatsu Noir	Take Aim at the Police Van	1960	Seijun Suzuki
17	Nikkatsu Noir	Cruel Gun Story	1964	Takumi Furukawa
17	Nikkatsu Noir	A Colt Is My Passport	1967	Takashi Nomura
18	Dušan Makavejev - Free Radical	Man Is Not a Bird	1965	Dušan Makavejev
18	Dušan Makavejev - Free Radical	Love Affair, or The Case of the Missing Switchboard Operator	1967	Dušan Makavejev
18	Dušan Makavejev - Free Radical	Innocence Unprotected	1968	Dušan Makavejev
19	Chantal Ackerman in the Seventies	La Chambre	1972	Chantal Akerman
19	Chantal Ackerman in the Seventies	Hotel Monterey	1972	Chantal Akerman
19	Chantal Ackerman in the Seventies	News from Home	1976	Chantal Akerman
19	Chantal Ackerman in the Seventies	Je tu il elle	1975	Chantal Akerman
19	Chantal Ackerman in the Seventies	Les Rendez-vous d'Anna	1978	Chantal Akerman
20	George Bernard Shaw on Film	Major Barbara	1941	Gabriel Pascal
20	George Bernard Shaw on Film	Caesar and Cleopatra	1945	Gabriel Pascal
20	George Bernard Shaw on Film	Androcles and the Lion	1952	Chester Erskine
21	Oshima's Outlaw Sixties	Pleasures of the Flesh	1965	Nagisa Ōshima
21	Oshima's Outlaw Sixties	Violence at Noon	1966	Nagisa Ōshima
21	Oshima's Outlaw Sixties	Sing a Song of Sex	1967	Nagisa Ōshima
21	Oshima's Outlaw Sixties	Japanese Summer: Double Suicide	1967	Nagisa Ōshima
21	Oshima's Outlaw Sixties	Three Resurrected Drunkards	1968	Nagisa Ōshima
22	Presenting Sacha Guitry	The Story of a Cheat	1936	Sacha Guitry
22	Presenting Sacha Guitry	The Pearls of the Crown	1937	Sacha Guitry
22	Presenting Sacha Guitry	Désiré	1937	Sacha Guitry
22	Presenting Sacha Guitry	Quadrille	1938	Sacha Guitry
23	The First Films of Akira Kurosawa	Sanshiro Sugata	1943	Akira Kurosawa
23	The First Films of Akira Kurosawa	The Most Beautiful	1944	Akira Kurosawa
23	The First Films of Akira Kurosawa	Sanshiro Sugata, Part Two	1945	Akira Kurosawa
23	The First Films of Akira Kurosawa	The Men Who Tread on the Tiger's Tail	1945	Akira Kurosawa
24	The Actually Dramas of Allan King	Warrendale	1967	Allan King
24	The Actually Dramas of Allan King	A Married Couple	1969	Allan King
24	The Actually Dramas of Allan King	Come on Children	1972	Allan King
24	The Actually Dramas of Allan King	Dying at Grace	2003	Allan King
24	The Actually Dramas of Allan King	Memory for Max, Claire, Ida and Company	2005	Allan King
25	Basil Dearden's London Underground	Sapphire	1959	Basil Dearden
25	Basil Dearden's London Underground	The League of Gentlemen^{†} (Note: Released on LaserDisc as Spine #318)	1960	Basil Dearden
25	Basil Dearden's London Underground	Victim^{†} (Note: Released on LaserDisc as Spine #358)	1961	Basil Dearden
25	Basil Dearden's London Underground	All Night Long	1962	Basil Dearden
26	Silent Naruse	Flunky, Work Hard!	1931	Mikio Naruse
26	Silent Naruse	No Blood Relation	1932	Mikio Naruse
26	Silent Naruse	Apart from You	1933	Mikio Naruse
26	Silent Naruse	Every-Night Dreams	1933	Mikio Naruse
26	Silent Naruse	Street Without End	1934	Mikio Naruse
27	Raffaello Matarazzo’s Runaway Melodramas	Chains	1949	Raffaello Matarazzo
27	Raffaello Matarazzo’s Runaway Melodramas	Tormento	1950	Raffaello Matarazzo
27	Raffaello Matarazzo’s Runaway Melodramas	Nobody's Children	1952	Raffaello Matarazzo
27	Raffaello Matarazzo’s Runaway Melodramas	The White Angel	1955	Raffaello Matarazzo
28	The Warped World of Koreyoshi Kurahara	Intimidation	1960	Koreyoshi Kurahara
28	The Warped World of Koreyoshi Kurahara	The Warped Ones	1960	Koreyoshi Kurahara
28	The Warped World of Koreyoshi Kurahara	I Hate But Love	1962	Koreyoshi Kurahara
28	The Warped World of Koreyoshi Kurahara	Black Sun	1964	Koreyoshi Kurahara
28	The Warped World of Koreyoshi Kurahara	Thirst for Love	1967	Koreyoshi Kurahara
29	Aki Kaurismäki’s Leningrad Cowboys	Leningrad Cowboys Go America	1989	Aki Kaurismäki
29	Aki Kaurismäki’s Leningrad Cowboys	Leningrad Cowboys Meet Moses	1994	Aki Kaurismäki
29	Aki Kaurismäki’s Leningrad Cowboys	Total Balalaika Show	1994	Aki Kaurismäki
30	Sabu!	Elephant Boy	1937	Robert Flaherty, Zoltán Korda
30	Sabu!	The Drum	1938	Zoltan Korda
30	Sabu!	Jungle Book	1942	Zoltan Korda
31	Three Popular Films by Jean-Pierre Gorin	Poto and Cabengo	1980	Jean-Pierre Gorin
31	Three Popular Films by Jean-Pierre Gorin	Routine Pleasures	1986	Jean-Pierre Gorin
31	Three Popular Films by Jean-Pierre Gorin	My Crasy Life	1992	Jean-Pierre Gorin
32	Pearls of the Czech New Wave	Pearls of the Deep	1966	Jiří Menzel, Věra Chytilová, Jaromil Jireš, Jan Němec, Evald Schorm
32	Pearls of the Czech New Wave	A Report on the Party and Guests	1966	Jan Němec
32	Pearls of the Czech New Wave	Return of the Prodigal Son	1967	Evald Schorm
32	Pearls of the Czech New Wave	Capricious Summer	1968	Jiří Menzel
32	Pearls of the Czech New Wave	The Joke	1969	Jaromil Jireš
33	Up All Night with Robert Downey Sr.	Babo 73	1964	Robert Downey Sr.
33	Up All Night with Robert Downey Sr.	Chafed Elbows	1966	Robert Downey Sr.
33	Up All Night with Robert Downey Sr.	No More Excuses	1968	Robert Downey Sr.
33	Up All Night with Robert Downey Sr.	Putney Swope	1969	Robert Downey Sr.
33	Up All Night with Robert Downey Sr.	Two Tons of Turquoise to Taos Tonight	1975	Robert Downey Sr.
34	Jean Grémillon During the Occupation	Remorques	1941	Jean Grémillon
34	Jean Grémillon During the Occupation	Lumière d'été	1943	Jean Grémillon
34	Jean Grémillon During the Occupation	Le Ciel est à Vous	1944	Jean Grémillon
35	Maidstone and Other films by Norman Mailer	Maidstone	1970	Norman Mailer
35	Maidstone and Other films by Norman Mailer	Wild 90	1968	Norman Mailer
35	Maidstone and Other films by Norman Mailer	Beyond the Law	1968	Norman Mailer
36	Three Wicked Melodramas from Gainsborough Pictures	The Man in Grey	1943	Leslie Arliss
36	Three Wicked Melodramas from Gainsborough Pictures	Madonna of the Seven Moons	1945	Arthur Crabtree
36	Three Wicked Melodramas from Gainsborough Pictures	The Wicked Lady	1945	Leslie Arliss
37	When Horror Came to Shochiku	The X from Outer Space	1967	Kazui Nihonmatsu
37	When Horror Came to Shochiku	Goke, Body Snatcher from Hell	1968	Hajime Soto
37	When Horror Came to Shochiku	Genocide	1968	Kazui Nihonmatsu
38	Masaki Kobayashi Against the System	The Thick-Walled Room	1956	Masaki Kobayashi
38	Masaki Kobayashi Against the System	I Will Buy You	1956	Masaki Kobayashi
38	Masaki Kobayashi Against the System	Black River	1956	Masaki Kobayashi
38	Masaki Kobayashi Against the System	The Inheritance	1962	Masaki Kobayashi
39	Early Fassbinder	Love Is Colder Than Death	1969	Rainer Werner Fassbinder
39	Early Fassbinder	Katzelmacher	1969	Rainer Werner Fassbinder
39	Early Fassbinder	Gods of the Plague	1969	Rainer Werner Fassbinder
39	Early Fassbinder	The American Soldier	1970	Rainer Werner Fassbinder
39	Early Fassbinder	Beware of a Holy Whore	1970	Rainer Werner Fassbinder
40	Late Ray	The Home and the World	1984	Satyajit Ray
40	Late Ray	An Enemy of the People	1989	Satyajit Ray
40	Late Ray	The Stranger	1991	Satyajit Ray
41	Kinoshita and World War II	Port of Flowers	1943	Keisuke Kinoshita
41	Kinoshita and World War II	The Living MagorokuThe Living Magoroku	1943	Keisuke Kinoshita
41	Kinoshita and World War II	Army	1944	Keisuke Kinoshita
41	Kinoshita and World War II	Morning for the Osone Family	1946	Keisuke Kinoshita
42	Silent Ozu - Three Crime Dramas	Walk Cheerfully	1930	Yasujirō Ozu
42	Silent Ozu - Three Crime Dramas	That Night's Wife	1930	Yasujirō Ozu
42	Silent Ozu - Three Crime Dramas	Dragnet Girl	1933	Yasujirō Ozu
43	Agnès Varda in California	Uncle Yanco	1968	Agnès Varda
43	Agnès Varda in California	Black Panthers	1970	Agnès Varda
43	Agnès Varda in California	Lions Love (. . . and Lies)	1969	Agnès Varda
43	Agnès Varda in California	Mur Murs	1981	Agnès Varda
43	Agnès Varda in California	Documenteur	1981	Agnès Varda
44	Julien Duvivier in the Thirties	David Golder	1930	Julien Duvivier
44	Julien Duvivier in the Thirties	Poil de carvotte	1932	Julien Duvivier
44	Julien Duvivier in the Thirties	La Tête d'un Homme	1933	Julien Duvivier
44	Julien Duvivier in the Thirties	Un carnet de bal	1937	Julien Duvivier
45	Claude Autant-Lara - Four Romantic Escapes from Occupied France	Le Mariage de Chiffon	1942	Claude Autant-Lara
45	Claude Autant-Lara - Four Romantic Escapes from Occupied France	Letters d'amour	1942	Claude Autant-Lara
45	Claude Autant-Lara - Four Romantic Escapes from Occupied France	Douce	1943	Claude Autant-Lara
45	Claude Autant-Lara - Four Romantic Escapes from Occupied France	Sylvie et le fantôme	1946	Claude Autant-Lara
46	Ingrid Bergman's Swedish Years	The Count of the Old Town	1935	Edvin Adolphson, Sigurd Wallén
46	Ingrid Bergman's Swedish Years	Walpurgis Night	1935	Gustaf Edgren
46	Ingrid Bergman's Swedish Years	Intermezzo	1936	Gustaf Molander
46	Ingrid Bergman's Swedish Years	Dollar	1938	Gustaf Molander
46	Ingrid Bergman's Swedish Years	A Woman's Face	1938	Gustaf Molander
46	Ingrid Bergman's Swedish Years	June Night	1940	Per Lindberg
47	Abbas Kiarostami - Early Shorts and Features	Bread and Alley	1970	Abbas Kiarostami
47	Abbas Kiarostami - Early Shorts and Features	Breaktime	1972	Abbas Kiarostami
47	Abbas Kiarostami - Early Shorts and Features	Experience	1973	Abbas Kiarostami
47	Abbas Kiarostami - Early Shorts and Features	The Traveler	1974	Abbas Kiarostami
47	Abbas Kiarostami - Early Shorts and Features	Two Solutions for One Problem	1974	Abbas Kiarostami
47	Abbas Kiarostami - Early Shorts and Features	So Can I	1975	Abbas Kiarostami
47	Abbas Kiarostami - Early Shorts and Features	Colors	1976	Abbas Kiarostami
47	Abbas Kiarostami - Early Shorts and Features	A Wedding Suit	1976	Abbas Kiarostami
47	Abbas Kiarostami - Early Shorts and Features	Tribute to Teachers	1977	Abbas Kiarostami
47	Abbas Kiarostami - Early Shorts and Features	Solution No.1	1978	Abbas Kiarostami
47	Abbas Kiarostami - Early Shorts and Features	First Case, Second Case	1979	Abbas Kiarostami
47	Abbas Kiarostami - Early Shorts and Features	Toothache	1980	Abbas Kiarostami
47	Abbas Kiarostami - Early Shorts and Features	Orderly or Disorderly	1981	Abbas Kiarostami
47	Abbas Kiarostami - Early Shorts and Features	The Chorus	1982	Abbas Kiarostami
47	Abbas Kiarostami - Early Shorts and Features	Fellow Citizen	1983	Abbas Kiarostami
47	Abbas Kiarostami - Early Shorts and Features	First Graders	1984	Abbas Kiarostami
47	Abbas Kiarostami - Early Shorts and Features	Homework	1989	Abbas Kiarostami
48	Kinuyo Tanka Directs	Love Letter	1953	Kinuyo Tanaka
48	Kinuyo Tanka Directs	The Moon Has Risen	1955	Kinuyo Tanaka
48	Kinuyo Tanka Directs	Forever a Woman	1955	Kinuyo Tanaka
48	Kinuyo Tanka Directs	The Wandering Princess	1960	Kinuyo Tanaka
48	Kinuyo Tanka Directs	Girls of the Night	1961	Kinuyo Tanaka
48	Kinuyo Tanka Directs	Love Under the Crucifix	1962	Kinuyo Tanaka
49	Five Radical Documentaries by Kazuo Hara and Sachiko Kobayashi	Goodbye CP	1972	Kazuo Hara
49	Five Radical Documentaries by Kazuo Hara and Sachiko Kobayashi	Extreme Private Eros: Love Song 1974	1974	Kazuo Hara
49	Five Radical Documentaries by Kazuo Hara and Sachiko Kobayashi	The Emperor's Naked Army Marches On	1987	Kazuo Hara
49	Five Radical Documentaries by Kazuo Hara and Sachiko Kobayashi	A Dedicated Life	1994	Kazuo Hara
49	Five Radical Documentaries by Kazuo Hara and Sachiko Kobayashi	Sennan Asbestos Disaster	2016	Kazuo Hara
50	Sara Gómez’s Revolutionary Cuba	One Way or Another	1977	Sara Gómez
50	Sara Gómez’s Revolutionary Cuba	I'll Got to Santiago	1964	Sara Gómez
50	Sara Gómez’s Revolutionary Cuba	Excursion to Vueltabajo	1965	Sara Gómez
50	Sara Gómez’s Revolutionary Cuba	Guanabacoa: Chronicle of My Family	1966	Sara Gómez
50	Sara Gómez’s Revolutionary Cuba	And . . . We’ve Got Sabor	1967	Sara Gómez
50	Sara Gómez’s Revolutionary Cuba	On the Other Island	1968	Sara Gómez
50	Sara Gómez’s Revolutionary Cuba	An Island for Miguel	1968	Sara Gómez
50	Sara Gómez’s Revolutionary Cuba	Treasure Island	1969	Sara Gómez
50	Sara Gómez’s Revolutionary Cuba	Local Power, Popular Power	1970	Sara Gómez
50	Sara Gómez’s Revolutionary Cuba	A Documentary About Transit	1971	Sara Gómez
50	Sara Gómez’s Revolutionary Cuba	On Sugar Workers' Quarters	1971	Sara Gómez
50	Sara Gómez’s Revolutionary Cuba	My Contribution	1972	Sara Gómez
50	Sara Gómez’s Revolutionary Cuba	Year One	1972	Sara Gómez
50	Sara Gómez’s Revolutionary Cuba	Prenatal Care	1972	Sara Gómez
50	Sara Gómez’s Revolutionary Cuba	About Extra Hours and Volunteer Work	1973	Sara Gómez
