= The Party (1968 film) =

1968 American comedy film by Blake Edwards

- Theatrical release poster. Illustration by Jack Davis.
- Directed by: Blake Edwards
- Screenplay by: Blake Edwards; Tom Waldman; Frank Waldman
- Story by: Blake Edwards
- Produced by: Blake Edwards
- Starring: Peter Sellers; Claudine Longet
- Cinematography: Lucien Ballard
- Edited by: Ralph E. Winters
- Music by: Henry Mancini
- Production company: The Mirisch Corporation
- Distributed by: United Artists
- Release date: April 4, 1968
- Running time: 99 minutes
- Country: United States
- Language: English
- Budget: $1.5 million
- Box office: $2.9 million (U.S. rentals)

The Party is a 1968 American comedy film, produced, co-written and directed by Blake Edwards. Based on a fish-out-of-water premise, it stars Peter Sellers as Hrundi V. Bakshi, a bungling actor from India, who accidentally gets invited to a lavish Hollywood dinner party. The film is a farce with a very loose structure; it essentially serves as a series of set pieces for Sellers's improvisational comedy talents.

The protagonist Hrundi Bakshi was influenced by two of Sellers' earlier characters: the Indian doctor Ahmed el Kabir in The Millionairess (1960) and Inspector Jacques Clouseau in The Pink Panther series. Bakshi went on to inspire popular characters such as Amitabh Bachchan's character Arjun Singh in Namak Halaal (1982), Apu Nahasapeemapetilon (voiced by Hank Azaria) in The Simpsons, and Mr. Bean. However, The Party has been criticized as having perpetuated brown stereotypes and using "brownface" with an exaggerated accent.

== Plot ==
The production of a costume epic film Son of Gunga Din is ruined when Indian actor Hrundi V. Bakshi accidentally blows up an enormous fort set. The director fires Bakshi immediately and complains to the studio head, General Fred R. Clutterbuck. Clutterbuck writes down Hrundi's name to blacklist him, but he inadvertently writes it on the guest list of his upcoming dinner party. Hrundi receives his invitation and drives to the party. Upon arriving, he steps in mud and tries to rinse his shoe in a shallow pool in the house. He loses his shoe, with which he is reunited after much difficulty, when it is served to him on a silver appetizer platter by a waiter.

Hrundi has several awkward interactions at the party. He meets famous Western movie actor "Wyoming Bill" Kelso, who gives Hrundi an autograph. Hrundi later accidentally shoots Kelso with a toy gun, and escapes before Kelso can see who did it. Hrundi feeds a caged macaw and drops the birdfeed on the floor. He fiddles with a panel of electronics that controls the intercom, a Manneken Pis sculpture (soaking a guest), and a retractable bar (where Clutterbuck is seated). After Kelso's handshake crushes Hrundi's hand, Hrundi sticks it into a bowl of crushed ice containing caviar. While waiting to wash his hand, he meets aspiring actress Michèle Monet, who came with producer C.S. Divot. Hrundi shakes hands with Divot, who does the same with other guests, passing around the fishy odor, and back to Hrundi after he has washed his hand.

At dinner, Hrundi is seated by the kitchen door in a very low chair. During the main course, Hrundi's roast cornish hen catapults off his fork and becomes impaled upon a guest's tiara. Hrundi asks an increasingly drunk waiter, Levinson, to retrieve his meal, but the woman's wig comes off as well, even as she remains oblivious. The drunk Levinson ends up brawling with his fellow wait staff, and dinner is disrupted.

Hrundi apologizes to his hosts. Desperate for a bathroom, he wanders through the house, opening doors and catching servants and guests in embarrassing situations. He ends up in the backyard, where he accidentally sets off the sprinklers. At Divot's insistence, Michèle gives an impromptu guitar performance of "Nothing to Lose" to impress the guests. Hrundi goes upstairs, where he saves Michèle from Divot's unwanted advances by dislodging Divot's toupee. Hrundi finally finds a bathroom, but he breaks the toilet, drops a painting in it, gets toilet paper everywhere, and floods the bathroom. To avoid being discovered Hrundi sneaks onto the roof and falls into the pool. After Michèle leaps in to save him, Hrundi is coerced to drink alcohol to warm up.

A Russian dance troupe arrives at the party. Upstairs, Hrundi finds Michèle crying and consoles her. Divot bursts in and demands Michèle leave with him. Michèle declines, and Divot cancels her upcoming screen test. Hrundi persuades her to stay and have a good time with him. They return to the party in borrowed clothes. The party gets wilder, and Hrundi offers to retract the bar to make room for dancing. Instead, he opens a retractable floor with a pool underneath, causing guests to fall in. Clutterbuck's daughter arrives with friends and a baby elephant painted with hippie slogans over its body. Hrundi takes offense and asks them to wash the elephant. The entire house is soon filled with soap bubbles.

Back at his home, Divot realizes who Hrundi is, and races back to the party. As the band plays on, Clutterbuck tries to save his suds-covered paintings. The air conditioning blows suds everywhere as the guests dance, and Clutterbuck's distraught wife repeatedly falls into the pool. Divot pulls up as the police and fire department personnel work to resolve everything. Hrundi apologizes one last time to Clutterbuck as Divot reveals who Hrundi is, but Clutterbuck accidentally chokes the headwaiter instead of Hrundi. Kelso gives Hrundi an autographed photo and Stetson hat as Hrundi and Michèle leave in Hrundi's Morgan three-wheeler car. Outside her apartment, Hrundi gives Michèle the hat as a keepsake, and she says he can come get it any time. Hrundi suggests next week, and she readily agrees. Hrundi smiles and drives off as his car backfires.

== Cast ==
- Peter Sellers as Hrundi V. Bakshi
- Claudine Longet as Michèle Monet
- Natalia Borisova as ballerina
- Jean Carson as Nanny
- Marge Champion as Rosalind Dunphy
- Al Checco as Bernard Stein
- Corinne Cole as Janice Kane
- Dick Crockett as Wells
- Frances Davis as maid
- Danielle de Metz as Stella D'Angelo
- Herb Ellis as the director
- Paul Ferrara as Ronnie Smith
- Steve Franken as Levinson
- Kathe Green as Molly Clutterbuck
- Allen Jung as cook
- Sharron Kimberly as Princess Helena
- James Lanphier as Harry
- Buddy Lester as Davey Kane
- Stephen Liss as Geoffrey Clutterbuck
- Gavin MacLeod as C. S. Divot
- Jerry Martin as Bradford
- Fay McKenzie as Alice Clutterbuck
- J. Edward McKinley as Fred Clutterbuck
- Denny Miller as "Wyoming Bill" Kelso
- Elianne Nadeau as Wiggy
- Thomas W. Quine as Congressman Dunphy
- Timothy Scott as Gore Pontoon
- Ken Wales as assistant director
- Carol Wayne as June Warren
- Donald R. Frost as drummer
- Helen Kleeb as secretary
- George Winters as cliff hanger
- Linda Gaye Scott as starlet

Vin Scully is uncredited and does not appear onscreen, but his voice can be heard announcing a Los Angeles Dodgers game on the kitchen radio.

== Production ==
The Party was the only non-Pink Panther collaboration between Peter Sellers and Blake Edwards. Producer Walter Mirisch knew that Sellers and Edwards were considered liabilities; in his autobiography I Thought We Were Making Movies, Not History, Mirisch wrote "Blake had achieved a reputation as a very expensive director, particularly after The Great Race." Sellers had played an Indian man (Dr. Ahmed el Kabir) in his hit film The Millionairess (1960), and another Indian physician in The Road to Hong Kong (1962). He is mostly remembered as a similar klutz as Inspector Jacques Clouseau in The Pink Panther series.

The film's interiors were shot on set. The original script was only 63 pages in length. Edwards later said it was the shortest script he ever shot from, and that the majority of the content in the film was improvised on set.

The film started shooting in May 1967 under the title RSVP, and lasted for 12 weeks over the summer of 1967. Edwards and Sellers had initially attempted to film part of it as a modern silent picture with subtitles, but Sellers soon found a need to speak and develop the character of Hrundi V. Bakshi, a name he came up with on the spot. Several cast and crew members described the production as the most enjoyable of their career, with Denny Miller describing it as "heaven", stating that they knew it was something special when cast and crew not even involved with the shooting of certain scenes would stick around just to watch the filming. Claudine Longet very visibly found it difficult to keep a straight face in many scenes. Steve Franken, who played Levinson the drunken butler, thoroughly enjoyed being allowed to improvise, but noted the dangers of the foam in the water and struggled to breathe. The pool scene where his love interest Janice Kane (Corinne Cole) pours a bottle on his face was improvised due to him murmuring to Cole to clear the foam from his face as he couldn't breathe.

The film draws much inspiration from the works of Jacques Tati; Bakshi arrives at the party in a Morgan three-wheeler which may suggest Monsieur Hulot's car in Monsieur Hulot's Holiday. However, it was not the same car (Salmson AL3). The entire film storyline is reminiscent of the Royal Garden restaurant sequence of Playtime, and the comedic interaction with inanimate objects and gadgets parallels several of Tati's films, especially Mon Oncle.

== Soundtrack ==
The score of The Party was composed by Henry Mancini, including the song "Nothing to Lose," performed onscreen by Claudine Longet. Mancini, commenting on audience reactions, noted, "That's what I get for writing a nice song for a comedy. Nobody's going to hear a note of it." During a scene later in the film, the band can be heard playing "It Had Better Be Tonight (Meglio stasera)," a song Mancini composed for the first Pink Panther film. The CD originally was released on August 20, 1995, by BMG Victor.

Track listing

Side 1:

1. "The Party" (Vocal) 2:14
2. "Brunette in Yellow" 2:56
3. "Nothing to Lose" (Instrumental) 3:18
4. "Chicken Little Was Right" 2:54
5. "Candleleight on Crystal" 3:05
6. "Birdie Num-Num" 2:21

Side 2:

1. "Nothing to Lose" (Vocal) 2:25
2. "The Happy Pipers" 2:17
3. "Party Poop" 2:34
4. "Elegant" 4:44
5. "Wiggy" 3:02
6. "The Party" (Instrumental) 3:12

== Reception ==
On review aggregator Rotten Tomatoes, the film has an approval rating of 83% based on 23 reviews, with an average score of 6.6/10. Metacritic, which uses a weighted average, assigned the film a score of 64 out of 100, based on 11 critics, indicating "generally favorable" reviews.

The Party is considered a classic comedic cult film. Edwards' biographers Peter Lehman and William Luhr said, "The Party may very well be one of the most radically experimental films in Hollywood history; in fact it may be the single most radical film since D.W. Griffith's style came to dominate the American cinema." Saul Austerlitz wrote "Despite the offensiveness of Sellers's brownface routine, The Party is one of his very best films...Taking a page from Tati, this is neorealist comedy, purposefully lacking a director's guiding eye: look here, look there. The screen is crammed full of activity, and the audience's eyes are left to wander where they may." American musician Matt Mahaffey and artist Brian Bottcher were influenced by the film's promotional campaign, consisting of lobby cards, basing the artwork of Self's third studio album Breakfast with Girls (1999) off the film.

=== Racial criticism ===
The Party has been criticized as having perpetuated brown stereotypes and using "brownface" with an exaggerated accent. Shane Danielson described it in The Guardian as "A comic masterpiece—yet hardly the most enlightened depiction of our subcontinental brothers. Still, propelled by Sellers's insane brio, this late display of blackface provided some guilty chuckles, and at least one enduring catchphrase (the immortal 'Birdie num-num')." (Edwards ran into similar later criticism for his inclusion of Mickey Rooney's overbroad Japanese caricature I. Y. Yunioshi in Breakfast at Tiffany's).

However, the film was also hugely popular in India. The Indian Prime Minister Indira Gandhi was a fan and was very fond of repeating Bakshi's line "In India we don't think who we are, we know who we are!", the character's reply to a hostile "Who do you think you are?" The character Hrundi Bakshi also inspired Amitabh Bachchan's character Arjun Singh in the 1982 Hindi-language film Namak Halaal. Additionally, for his film The Alien, Indian director Satyajit Ray was planning on casting Sellers as a Marwari businessman. Ray was a fan of Sellers, and believed he could convincingly portray Indian characters based on his performances in The Party and The Millionairess. Sellers eventually pulled out of the project and the film fell apart.
