= Parade (1974 film) =

1974 French comedy film by Jacques Tati

- Written by: Jacques Tati
- Directed by: Jacques Tati
- Starring: Jacques Tati; Karl Kossmayer; Pierre Bramma; Michèle Brabo; Juri Jägestedt; Dominique Lavanant
- Music by: Janne 'Loffe' Carlsson; Charles Dumont
- Country of origin: France/Sweden
- Original language: French

Production
- Producers: Michel Chauvin; Karl Haskel
- Cinematography: Jean Badal; Gunnar Fischer
- Editors: Aline Asséo; Per Carleson; Siv Lundgren; Jonny Mair; Sophie Tatischeff
- Running time: 89 minutes

Original release
- Release: 18 December 1974 (France)
- Release: 8 February 1975 (Sweden)

Parade is a French comedy film and was the final film directed by Jacques Tati. Parade was made for Swedish television in 1974 and featured Tati as a clown in a circus.

== History ==
Tati's finances were hit hard by the failure of PlayTime to recover its enormous production costs, after which he sold his family residence. Parade was released three years after Trafic, which had been funded by Dutch capital; Parade was bankrolled by a Swedish television station and, because of the severe budget constraints, is much smaller in cinematic scope than both PlayTime and Trafic. Gunnar Fischer, who had been director of photography on many of Ingmar Bergman's films, handled the cinematography for Parade. Filming took place at the Stockholm Cirkus in 1973 and employed a mixture of video, 16mm and 35mm stock.

The film begins with a crowd of colorfully-dressed people filing into a theater that is being set up for a clown-themed performance. Tati, in the role of Monsieur Loyal, informs the audience that they are invited to be part of the show, which he calls "the parade". He serves essentially as emcee for a variety show that includes sight gags, mime, juggling, slapstick skits, dancing, animal acts, musical jokes, and magic tricks. At times, audience members participate in the festivities.

The film was screened at the 1974 Cannes Film Festival, but was not entered into the main competition.

It was released on Blu-ray in 2014 as part of the Criterion Collection's The Complete Jacques Tati box-set.

== Reception ==
Roger Ebert gave the film 2 out of 4 stars, writing that it "has flashes of wit and style, but it's slow, offhand and meandering, and not Tati at his best."

Time Out called it "An eccentric slice of light entertainment ring-mastered by Tati."
