= School for Postmen =

- French: L'École des facteurs
- Directed by: Jacques Tati
- Starring: Jacques Tati; Paul Demange
- Release date: 1947
- Running time: 16 minutes
- Country: France

School for Postmen (French: L'École des facteurs) is a 1947 French short comedy film directed by Jacques Tati. Tati plays a French postman learning to be as fast as he can in delivering mail. The film includes several sight gags that involve his bicycle. He replicated most of the action here in his first major feature film, Jour de fête, released two years later.

The 15-minute film is included on the Mon Oncle DVD, part of the Criterion Collection.

== Cast ==
- Jacques Tati as Postman
- Paul Demange as Chief Postman
