= Mr. Bean's Holiday =

2007 film directed by Steve Bendelack

- Theatrical release poster
- Directed by: Steve Bendelack
- Screenplay by: Hamish McColl; Robin Driscoll
- Story by: Simon McBurney
- Based on: Mr. Bean by: Rowan Atkinson; Richard Curtis
- Produced by: Peter Bennett-Jones; Tim Bevan; Eric Fellner
- Starring: Rowan Atkinson; Emma de Caunes; Willem Dafoe
- Cinematography: Baz Irvine
- Edited by: Tony Cranstoun
- Music by: Howard Goodall
- Production companies: Universal Pictures; StudioCanal; Working Title Films; Tiger Aspect Pictures
- Distributed by: Universal Pictures (International); StudioCanal (France)
- Release dates: 25 March 2007 (Odeon Leicester Square); 30 March 2007 (United Kingdom)
- Running time: 89 minutes
- Countries: United Kingdom; France; Germany; United States
- Language: English
- Budget: $25 million
- Box office: $232.2 million

Mr. Bean's Holiday is a 2007 comedy film directed by Steve Bendelack from a screenplay written by Hamish McColl and Robin Driscoll, based on a story by Simon McBurney. Based on the British sitcom series Mr. Bean created by Rowan Atkinson and Richard Curtis, it is a stand-alone sequel to Bean (1997). The film stars Atkinson as Mr. Bean, with Maxim Baldry, Emma de Caunes, Willem Dafoe and Karel Roden in supporting roles. In the film, Mr. Bean wins a trip to Cannes, France, but on his way there, he is mistaken for a kidnapper and meets an award-winning filmmaker after he travels with both a Russian filmmaker's son and an aspiring actress in tow.

Produced by StudioCanal, Working Title Films and Tiger Aspect Pictures, Mr. Bean's Holiday premiered on 25 March 2007 at the Odeon Leicester Square in London, and was theatrically released in the United Kingdom on 30 March 2007 by Universal Pictures. It received mixed reviews from critics but was a box-office success, grossing $232 million against a budget of $25 million.

== Plot ==
Mr. Bean wins a holiday trip to Cannes, a video camera and €200 in a raffle. Upon arriving in France, Bean causes chaos while trying French seafood cuisine at Le Train Bleu and asks Russian film director Emil Duchevsky to film him boarding his train using his video camera at the Gare de Lyon. However, the two keep doing retakes at Bean's request until the train leaves with Bean and Duchevsky's son, Stepan, onboard and Duchevsky left behind.

A 10-minute segment of the film

Bean and Stepan bond and get off together at the next station, which Duchevsky's train passes through without stopping; Duchevsky holds up a sign with a mobile phone number written on it for Stepan to call, but inadvertently obscures the last two digits. After Bean unsuccessfully calls the number with various combinations of digits in place of the unknown ones, another train arrives and the two get on. They are promptly ejected in Cavaillon as Bean had accidentally left his wallet, passport and ticket at the previous stop.

To earn money, Bean busks as a mime and buys himself and Stepan food and bus tickets to Cannes. However, Bean's ticket is caught in the wind and eventually stuck on the foot of a chicken, which is then packed into a farmer's truck. Bean chases the vehicle via bicycle to a farm, where he is unable to locate his ticket due to the large number of chickens there. Following an unsuccessful hitchhiking attempt, he continues his journey alone on foot. Sometime later, Bean awakes on the set of an elaborate yogurt commercial directed by American filmmaker Carson Clay and starring aspiring actress Sabine, in which a quaint French village is under attack from Nazi soldiers. Mistaken for an extra, Bean briefly stars in the commercial as one of the soldiers before being dismissed for showing his video camera in the advert, and accidentally causes the set to explode while recharging his camera.

Continuing to hitchhike, Bean is picked up by a Mini identical to his own driven by Sabine, who is on her way to the Cannes Film Festival, where her debut film directed by Clay, Playback Time, is to be presented. They stop at a service station, where Bean reunites with Stepan. Sabine takes him with them, believing Stepan to be Bean's son. The next morning, the trio arrive in Cannes thanks to Bean driving through the night after Sabine falls asleep.

At a petrol station, Sabine sees on the news that she and Bean are suspected of kidnapping Stepan. In a rush to Playback Time's premiere, rather than heading to the police to clear the misunderstandings, she has Bean and Stepan disguised as her mother and daughter to avoid detection at the festival. During the premiere, the audience shows complete disinterest in Playback Time, which centers on a homicide detective's pining for a lost love. Sabine discovers that her role has been cut, prompting Bean to plug his video camera into the projector and replace the film's visuals with his video diary. The footage aligns with the film's narration to present Sabine as the hero's lost love, Bean as her new lover and Stepan as their son. Clay, Sabine and Bean all receive a standing ovation, which becomes more enthusiastic when Stepan is reunited with his parents onstage.

Bean exits through the theatre's back door and arrives at the Cannes beach as he desired, and joins Sabine, Stepan, Clay and other people in miming to the song "La Mer".

== Cast ==
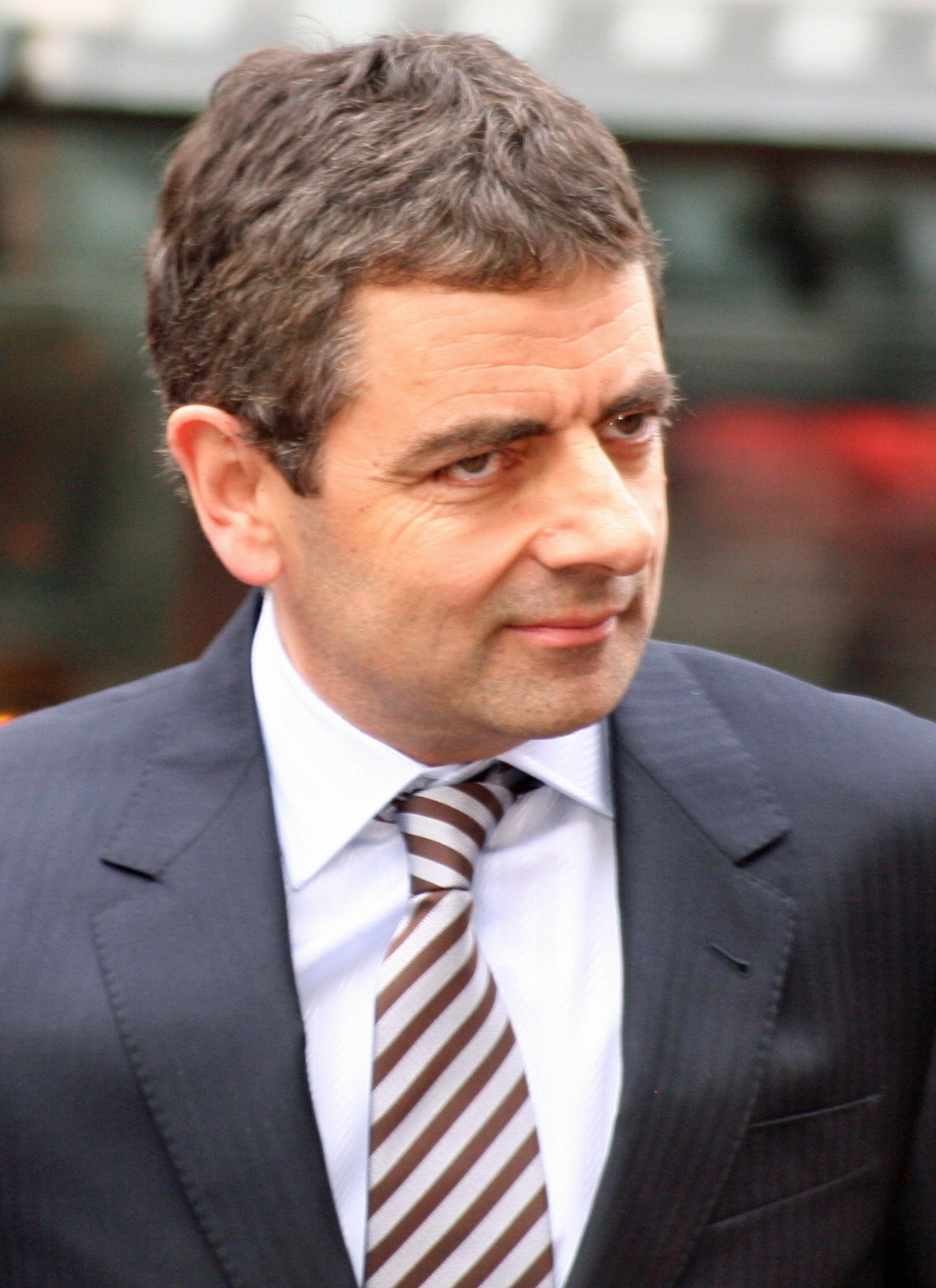
Rowan Atkinson at a premiere for the film in 2007

- Rowan Atkinson as Mr. Bean
- Emma de Caunes as Sabine
- Maxim Baldry as Stepan Duchevsky
- Willem Dafoe as Carson Clay
- Jean Rochefort as the Maître d'Hôtel
- Karel Roden as Emil Duchevsky
- Steve Pemberton as The Vicar
- Catherine Hosmalin as Ticket Inspector
- Urbain Cancelier as Bus driver
- Stéphane Debac as Traffic Controller
- Julie Ferrier as The First AD
- Lily Atkinson as Lily

== Production ==
Plans for a second Mr. Bean film were first revealed in February 2001, when Rowan Atkinson was lured into developing a sequel to Bean during filming on Scooby-Doo. Written by Mr. Bean co-creator Richard Curtis, the sequel's working title was Down Under Bean, and was intended to follow Mr. Bean heading to Australia on a voyage of discovery. However, no further announcements regarding the film were made until early 2005.

In March 2005, the film was officially announced, then titled Bean 2, with Simon McBurney, co-founder and artistic director of the Théâtre de Complicité theatre company, writing the script. McBurney decided to set the film in France because it was a place where the visual-oriented Mr. Bean would not be expected to talk much, due to his limited knowledge of French. The running gag involving Bean saying "Gracias" to French people was inspired by McBurney's great uncle, who told McBurney's father he "had no trouble with the language barrier during his tour of Europe because he knew the essential French word 'Gracias'".

Principal photography for the film began on 15 May 2006 and took place on location across England and France, particularly during the 2006 Cannes Film Festival. At that point, the film's title was changed from Bean 2 to French Bean, and later to Mr. Bean's Holiday, which was a reference to the 1953 French comedy film Monsieur Hulot's Holiday, which served as an inspiration for the character of Mr. Bean.

Atkinson said that despite the great length of time since he had last portrayed Mr. Bean, he had no problem getting back into the character. In 2022, Atkinson reflected that since he was neither an athlete nor a cyclist, he found the cycling sequence to be the most difficult thing he had ever done as Mr. Bean.

=== Music ===
The film score was composed and conducted by Howard Goodall, who also composed the original Mr. Bean series, although the original Mr. Bean theme was unused. In contrast to the series' use of simple musical repetitions, the film uses a symphonic orchestration, resulting in a sophisticated score that features catchy leitmotifs for particular characters and scenes. The film's theme song was a cover of the Primitives' song "Crash" by Matt Willis.

OEDO-808 by Pistol Valve is used for the Japanese release.

== Release ==
=== Theatrical ===
Mr. Bean's Holiday served as the official film for Red Nose Day 2007, with money made from the film going to the telethon's charity Comic Relief. Prior to the film's release, a new Mr. Bean sketch exclusive to the telethon, titled Mr. Bean's Wedding, was broadcast on BBC One on 16 March 2007.

The premiere of the film took place at the Odeon Leicester Square on 25 March 2007, and helped to raise money for both Comic Relief and the Oxford Children's Hospital. Universal Pictures released a teaser trailer for the film in November 2006 and launched an official website online the following month.

=== Home media ===
Mr. Bean's Holiday was released on DVD and HD DVD in the UK on 20 August 2007, and on 27 November 2007 in North America. It was later released on Blu-ray in the United States on April 16, 2019.

== Reception ==
=== Box office ===
Mr. Bean's Holiday opened in the United States on 24 August 2007 alongside War and The Nanny Diaries, and grossed $9,889,780 in its opening weekend while playing in 1,714 theaters, with a $5,770 per-theater average and ranking fourth at the box office. The film then closed on 18 October 2007 with a final domestic gross of $33,302,167 and a final international gross of $198,923,741. Culminating in a worldwide total of $232,225,908, the film has become commercially successful considering its $25 million budget. The film was released in the United Kingdom on 30 March 2007 and topped the country's box office for the next two weekends, before being dethroned by Wild Hogs.

=== Critical response ===
On Rotten Tomatoes, the film has an approval rating of 51% based on 115 reviews with an average rating of 5.40/10. The site's critical consensus reads, "Mr. Bean's Holiday means well, but good intentions can't withstand the 90 minutes of monotonous slapstick and tired, obvious gags." On Metacritic, the film has a score of 56 out of 100 based on 26 critics, indicating "mixed or average reviews". Audiences polled by CinemaScore gave the film an average grade of "B" on an A+ to F scale.

BBC film critic Paul Arendt gave the film 3 out of 5 stars, saying that, "It's hard to explain the appeal of Mr. Bean. At first glance, he seems to be moulded from the primordial clay of nightmares: a leering man-child with a body like a tangle of tweed-coated pipe cleaners and the gurning, window-licking countenance of a suburban sex offender. It's a testament to Rowan Atkinson's skill that, by the end of the film he seems almost cuddly." Philip French of The Observer referred to the character of Mr. Bean as a "dim-witted sub-Hulot loner" and said the plot involves Atkinson "getting in touch with his retarded inner child". French also said "the best joke (Bean on an old bike riding faster than a team of professional cyclists) is taken directly from Tati's Jour de Fete." Wendy Ide of The Times gave the film 2 out of 5 stars and said "It has long been a mystery to the British, who consider Bean to be, at best, an ignoble secret weakness, that Rowan Atkinson's repellent creation is absolutely massive on the Continent." Ide said parts of the film are reminiscent of City of God, The Straight Story and said two scenes are "clumsily borrowed" from Pee-wee's Big Adventure. Ide also wrote that the jokes are weak and one gag "was past its sell-by date ten years ago".

Steve Rose of The Guardian gave the film 2 out of 5 stars, saying that the film was full of awfully weak gags, and "In a post-Borat world, surely there's no place for Bean's antiquated fusion of Jacques Tati, Pee-Wee Herman and John Major?", while Colm Andrew of the Manx Independent said "the flimsiness of the character, who is essentially a one-trick pony, starts to show" and his "continual close-up gurning into the camera" becomes tiresome. Peter Rainer of The Christian Science Monitor gave the film a "B" and said, "Since Mr. Bean rarely speaks a complete sentence, the effect is of watching a silent movie with sound effects. This was also the dramatic ploy of the great French director-performer Jacques Tati, who is clearly the big influence here." Amy Biancolli of the Houston Chronicle gave the film 3 out of 4 stars, saying "Don't mistake this simpleton hero, or the movie's own simplicity, for a lack of smarts. Mr. Bean's Holiday is quite savvy about filmmaking, landing a few blows for satire." Biancolli said the humour is "all elementally British and more than a touch French. What it isn't, wasn't, should never attempt to be, is American. That's the mistake made by Mel Smith and the ill-advised forces behind 1997's Bean: The Movie."

Ty Burr of The Boston Globe wrote, "Either you'll find [Atkinson] hilarious—or he'll seem like one of those awful, tedious comedians who only thinks he's hilarious." Burr also said "There are also a few gags stolen outright from Tati", but concluded "Somewhere, Jacques Tati is smiling." Tom Long of The Detroit News said, "Watching 90 minutes of this stuff—we're talking broad, broad comedy here—may seem a bit much, but this film actually picks up steam as it rolls along, becoming ever more absurd." and also "Mr. Bean offers a refreshingly blunt reminder of the simple roots of comedy in these grim, overly manufactured times."

Suzanne Condie Lambert of The Arizona Republic wrote, "Atkinson is a gifted physical comedian. And the film is a rarity: a kid-friendly movie that was clearly not produced as a vehicle for selling toys and video games", but also said that "It's hard to laugh at a character I'm 95 percent sure is autistic." Lawrence Toppman of The Charlotte Observer gave the film 2½ stars out of 4 and said "If you like [the character], you will certainly like Mr. Bean's Holiday, a 10-years-later sequel to Bean. I found him intermittently funny yet almost unrelentingly creepy", and also "Atkinson doesn't have the deadpan elegance of a Buster Keaton or the wry, gentle physicality of a Jacques Tati (whose Mr. Hulot's Holiday inspired the title). He's funniest when mugging shamelessly..."

Ruthe Stein of the San Francisco Chronicle said that "the disasters instigated by Bean's haplessness quickly become tiresome and predictable" but said that one scene later in the film "is worth sticking around for". Elizabeth Weitzman of the New York Daily News gave the film 2 out of 4 stars and said "If you've never been particularly fond of Atkinson's brand of slapstick, you certainly won't be converted by this trifle." and also "If the title sounds familiar, it's because Atkinson intends his movie to be an homage to the 1953 French classic Mr. Hulot's Holiday. Mr. Hulot was played by one of the all-time great physical comedians, Jacques Tati, and that movie is a genuine delight from start to finish. This version offers a few laughs and an admirable commitment to old-fashioned fun." Phil Villarreal of the Arizona Daily Star gave the film 2 stars and said "If you've seen 10 minutes of Rowan Atkinson's Mr. Bean routine, you've seen it all", and "The Nazi stuff is a bit out of place in a G-rated movie. Or any movie, really", later calling Atkinson "a has-Bean". Claudia Puig of USA Today gave the film 1½ stars out of 4 and said "If you've been lobotomized or have the mental age of a kindergartener, Mr. Bean's Holiday is viable comic entertainment" and also, "The film, set mostly in France, pays homage to Jacques Tati, but the mostly silent gags feel like watered-down Bean."

=== Accolades ===
Max Baldry was nominated for Best Performance in a Feature Film – Supporting Young Actor at the 29th Young Artist Awards in 2008. The film was nominated as Comedy or Musical and Best Comedy at the First National Movie Awards in 2007.

== See also ==
- List of films featuring fictional films
