= Rhumb =

Rhumb may refer to:

- Rhumb line, a navigational path with a constant bearing
- one of the 16 or 32 points of the compass (now rare)
- a nautical unit of angular measure equal to 1/32 of a circle or 11 1/4° (now rare)

== See also ==
- Bearing (navigation)
- RumB, an enzyme
- Rhum (disambiguation)
- Rhombus (disambiguation)
