= Maria Kimberly =

American actress

Maria Kimberly (born July 21, 1944, as Mary Ann Kimmerle, 1943 or 1944) is a former American top model and actress.

== Biography ==
She grew up in Terre Haute, Indiana, and, then, Columbus, Ohio. She was a top model in the late sixties and early seventies. In the seventies, she was the girlfriend for many years of Paris billionaire art gallerist Alec Wildenstein who left her when he met his future wife Jocelyne Périsset. Though they were never married, Alec Wildenstein ended up reaching a financial settlement with Kimberly. In 1982 she married real estate mogul and lawyer Jay Landesman and lived as Mary Ann Kimmerle Landesman in New York City.

In Jacques Tati's penultimate film Trafic, she played Maria, the press attaché of Altra.
