= List of submissions to the 31st Academy Awards for Best Foreign Language Film =

1958 Best Foreign Language Film submissions

Highlights
- Oscar winner: (France) Mon Oncle
- Submissions: 10
- Debuts: 2

This is a list of submissions to the 31st Academy Awards for Best Foreign Language Film. The Academy Award for Best Foreign Language Film was created in 1956 by the Academy of Motion Picture Arts and Sciences to honour non-English-speaking films produced outside the United States. The award is handed out annually, and is accepted by the winning film's director, although it is considered an award for the submitting country as a whole. Countries are invited by the Academy to submit their best films for competition according to strict rules, with only one film being accepted from each country.

For the 31st Academy Awards, ten films were submitted in the category Academy Award for Best Foreign Language Film. The United Arab Republic (Egypt) and Yugoslavia submitted films to the competition for the first time. The five nominated films came from France, Italy, Spain, West Germany and Yugoslavia.

France won for the fourth time (its first competitive win) with Mon Oncle by Jacques Tati.

== Submissions ==
Submitting country	Film title used in nomination	Original title	Language(s)	Director(s)	Result
Denmark	Dollars from the Sky	Guld og grønne skove	Danish	Gabriel Axel	Not nominated
France	Mon Oncle		French	Jacques Tati	Won Academy Award
West Germany	Arms and the Man	Helden	German	Franz Peter Wirth	Nominated
India	Madhumati	मधुमती	Hindi	Bimal Roy	Not nominated
Italy	Big Deal on Madonna Street	I soliti ignoti	Italian	Mario Monicelli	Nominated
Japan	Ballad of Narayama	楢山節考	Japanese	Keisuke Kinoshita	Not nominated
Spain	La Venganza		Spanish	Juan Antonio Bardem	Nominated
Sweden	The Magician	Ansiktet	Swedish	Ingmar Bergman	Not nominated
United Arab Republic	Cairo Station	باب الحديد	Egyptian Arabic	Youssef Chahine	Not nominated
Yugoslavia	The Road a Year Long	La strada lunga un anno	Italian	Giuseppe De Santis	Nominated

== Sources ==
- Margaret Herrick Library, Academy of Motion Picture Arts and Sciences
