= Rhum =

Rhum can mean:

- Rùm, a Scottish island also known as "Rhum"
- Rhum agricole, French for sugarcane juice rum
- MV Rhum island class ferry
- Rhum gasfield, North Sea, UK sector
- Rhum (actor), in the French short film Gai dimanche

== See also ==
- Rhumb (disambiguation)
