= Alain Romans =

French composer

Alain Romans (born Roman Abram Szlezynger; 13 January 1905 – 19 December 1988) was a French jazz composer. He studied in Leipzig, Berlin, and Paris. His teachers included Vincent d'Indy. He later worked with Josephine Baker and Django Reinhardt.

Romans wrote music for 12 films. The most famous of them are the films of comedian Jacques Tati, including Les Vacances de Monsieur Hulot (1953), with the theme song "Quel temps fait-il a Paris?", and Mon Oncle (1959).
