= Cours du soir =

Cours du Soir
- Directed by: Nicolas Ribowski
- Written by: Jacques Tati
- Produced by: Specta Films
- Starring: Jacques Tati
- Cinematography: Jean Badal
- Music by: Léo Petit
- Release date: 1967
- Running time: 26 minutes
- Country: France

Cours du Soir (Evening Classes) is a thirty-minute short film in which Jacques Tati demonstrates the art of mime to a group of enthusiastic students. Amongst skits performed are those of a tennis player and a horse rider – sketches that initially brought Tati acclaim on music hall stages in the 1930s. Nicolas Ribowski directed the short on the set of Playtime in 1966.
