= Les Vacances de Monsieur Hulot =

- Reissue poster by Pierre Étaix.
- Les Vacances de M. Hulot
- Directed by: Jacques Tati
- Written by: Jacques Tati; Henri Marquet
- Produced by: Fred Orain; Jacques Tati
- Starring: Jacques Tati; Nathalie Pascaud; Micheline Rolla
- Cinematography: Jacques Mercanton; Jean Mousselle
- Edited by: Suzanne Baron; Charles Bretoneiche; Jacques Grassi
- Music by: Alain Romans
- Distributed by: DisCina
- Release date: 25 February 1953
- Running time: 98 minutes (1953 version); 86 minutes (1978 version)
- Country: France
- Language: French

Les Vacances de Monsieur Hulot (English: /uːloʊ/ yoo-LOH, French: [məsjø ylo]), released as Monsieur Hulot's Holiday in the US, is a 1953 French comedy film starring and directed by Jacques Tati. It introduced the pipe-smoking, well-meaning but clumsy character of Monsieur Hulot, who appears in Tati's subsequent films, including Mon Oncle (1958), Playtime (1967), and Trafic (1971). The film gained an international reputation for its creator when released in 1953. The film was very successful, totalling 5,071,920 ticket sales in France.

== Plot ==
The following synopsis reflects the 1978 re-edited version.

While passengers board a train at an unnamed railway station and bus stop, Monsieur Hulot, an apparent bachelor of comedic gait, instead drives his rudimentary 1924 Salmson AL car to the beachside holiday hotel. On his arrival at the hotel, Hulot causes chaos when he opens the door during a stiff sea breeze. Later that night, Hulot arrives at the hotel restaurant and waits to be served.

As guests lounge around at the beach, Hulot helps a young woman named Martine and her aunt with their luggage. Inside the hotel lounge, guests are bothered by Hulot's loud playing of a record and have it turned off. As he looks for something to do, Hulot joins Denise, a young girl scout with a backpack. Sometime later, Hulot goes sailing in his kayak, but the kayak breaks in half and is mistaken for a shark's fin by the beachgoers. Hulot returns from the beach and tracks dirty shoeprints inside the hotel.

Later on, Hulot drives a man to a funeral. As Hulot repairs his car, he pulls out a tire, which becomes covered in leaves and is mistaken for a funeral wreath. Hulot next plays a tennis match and wins decisively. Back at the hotel, Hulot plays table tennis but loses sight of the ball when it lands in the lounge. The next morning, as Martine goes horseback riding, Hulot tries to mount on a horse but his steed breaks free and locks a man inside his trunk. Later that same night, he dances with Martine at a costume party.

Hulot faces more everyday mishaps, including attempts to jack a car with a flat tire and setting off fireworks in the middle of the night. Before long, the beachgoers leave the resort and bid their farewells to Hulot, who also departs.

== Cast ==
- Jacques Tati as Monsieur Hulot
- Nathalie Pascaud as Martine
- Micheline Rolla as The Aunt
- Valentine Camax as Englishwoman
- Louis Perrault as Fred
- André Dubois as The Major
- Lucien Frégis as Hotel Proprietor
- Raymond Carl as Waiter
- René Lacourt as Strolling Man
- Marguerite Gérard as Strolling Woman
- Claude Schillio as Photographer
- Christopher Lee provided all the voices for the English dub of the film.

== Style ==
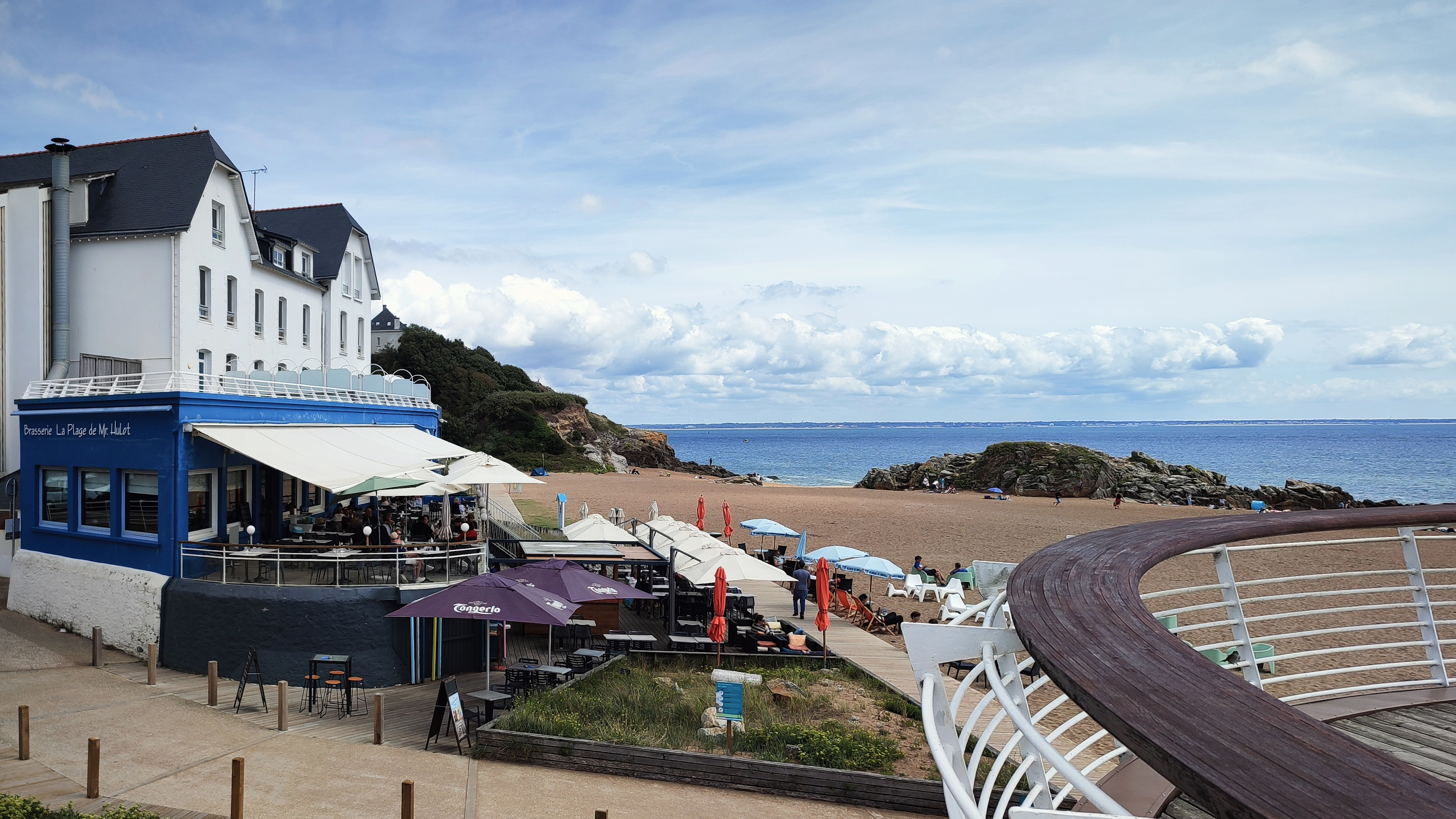
The principal setting for the film, Hôtel de la Plage at Saint-Marc-sur-Mer (Saint-Nazaire), France, in 2009 is now run by Best Western Hotels

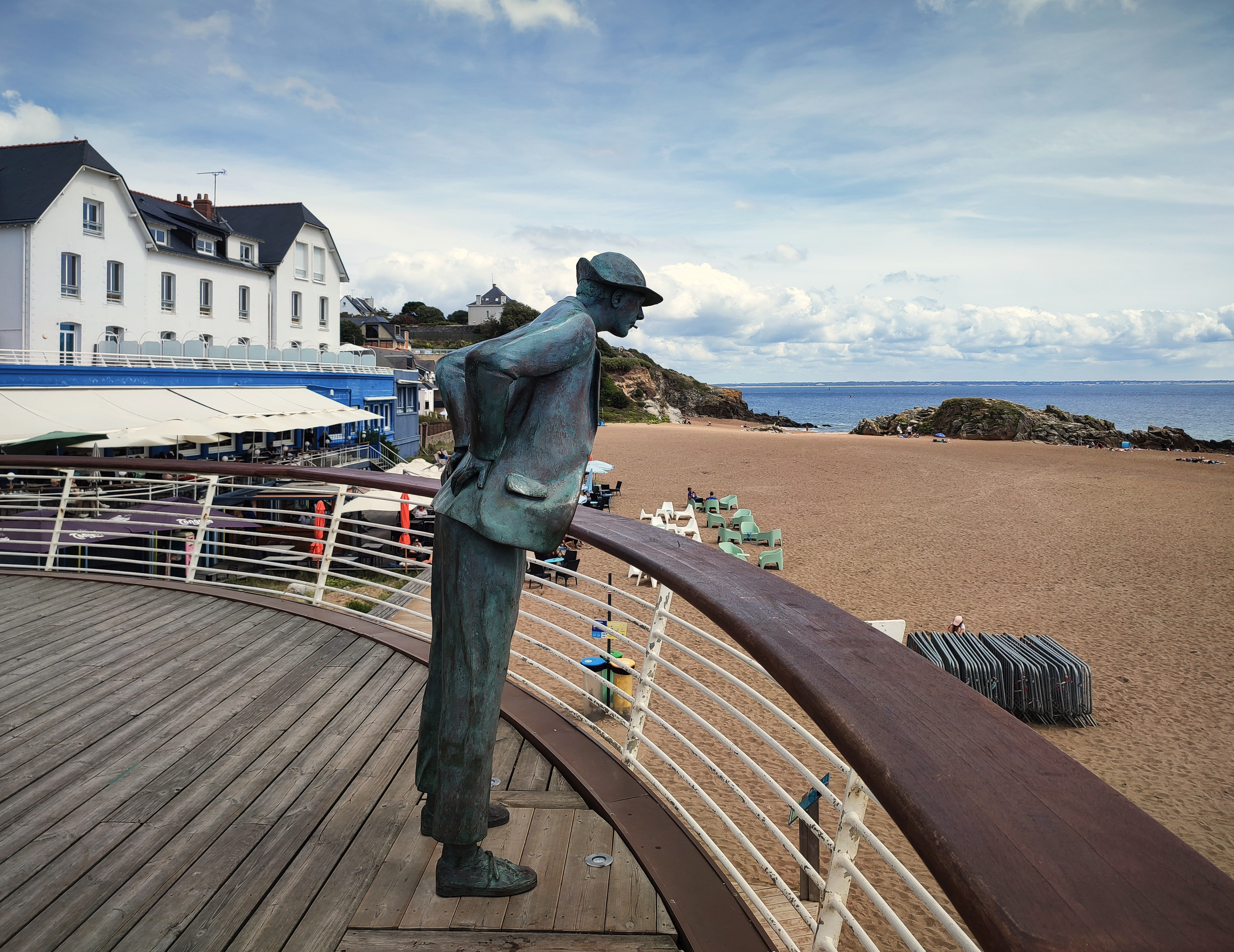
Statue of Mr Hulot in Saint-Marc-sur-Mer

For the most part, in Les Vacances, spoken dialogue is limited to the role of background sounds. Combined with frequent long shots of scenes with multiple characters, Tati believed that the results would tightly focus audience attention on the comical nature of humanity when interacting as a group, as well as his own meticulously choreographed visual gags. However, the film is by no means a 'silent' comedy, as it uses natural and man-made sounds not only for comic effect but also for character development.

The film was made in both French- and English-language versions. While Tati had experimented with color film in Jour de fête, Les Vacances is black and white.

The jazz score, mostly variations on the theme "Quel temps fait-il à Paris", was written by Alain Romans. The folk song that plays on the radio as Hulot arrives at the Hotel is sung in English and is The Days of the Kerry Dancing by the nineteenth century Irish composer J C Molloy. It is a lament for the lost joys of youth. The tune that keeps on being played at high volume on the hotel's electric gramophone is Tiger Rag.

Les Vacances was shot in the town of Saint-Marc-sur-Mer, which lies on the edge of the industrial port of Saint-Nazaire, in the Département of Loire-Atlantique. Tati had fallen in love with the beguiling coastline while staying in nearby Port Charlotte with his friends, M. and Mme Lemoine, before the war and resolved to return one day to make a film there. Tati and his crew turned up in the summer of 1951, "took over the town and then presented it to the world as the quintessence of French middle-class life as it rediscovered its rituals in the aftermath of the Second World War." "Neither too big nor too small, [St Marc fit the bill] - a sheltered inlet, with a graceful curve of sand, it boasted a hotel on the beach, L'Hotel de la Plage, on which the main action could be centred. Beach huts, windbreaks, fishing boats and outcrops of rock helped to complete a picture which was all the more idyllic for being so unspectacular." A bronze statue of Monsieur Hulot was later erected and overlooks the beach where the film was made.

== Critical response ==
On its release in the United States, Bosley Crowther wrote that the film contained "much the same visual satire that we used to get in the 'silent' days from the pictures of Charlie Chaplin, Buster Keaton, and such as those." He said the film "exploded with merriment" and that Tati "is a long-legged, slightly pop-eyed gent whose talent for caricaturing the manners of human beings is robust and intense...There is really no story to the picture...The dialogue...is at a minimum, and it is used just to satirize the silly and pointless things that summer people say. Sounds of all sorts become firecrackers, tossed in for comical point."

Tati biographer David Bellos has described the film as "sublime" and stated "It was through this film that I first fell in love with France. I think that is true of a lot of people." The journalist Simon O'Hagan, on the occasion of the film's 50th anniversary in 2003, wrote that the film "might contain the greatest collection of sight gags ever committed to celluloid, but it is the context in which they are placed and the atmosphere of the film that lift it into another realm. The central character is an unforgettable amalgam of bafflement at the modern world, eagerness to please and just the right amount of eccentricity - i.e. not too much - his every effort to fit in during his seaside holiday merely succeeds in creating chaos out of orderliness. Puncturing the veneer of the comfortably off at play is by no means the least of Tati's concerns. But, [there is] an elegiac quality [too], the sense that what Tati finds funny he also cherishes."

The film was entered into the 1953 Cannes Film Festival.

The film's comic influence has extended well beyond France and can be found as recently as 2007 in the Rowan Atkinson comic vehicle Mr. Bean's Holiday.

== Awards and honors ==
Award	Category	Nominee(s)	Result	Ref.
Academy Awards	Best Story and Screenplay	Jacques Tati and Henri Marquet	Nominated	
Cannes Film Festival	Palme d'Or	Jacques Tati	Nominated	
Louis Delluc Prize	Best Film	Jacques Tati	Won	
National Board of Review Awards	Top Foreign Films		8th Place	
New York Film Critics Circle Awards	Best Foreign Language Film		Nominated	

- Ranked #49 on Empire magazine's list of the 100 Best Films of World Cinema.
- Ranked #7 on The Guardian's list of 20 best summer holiday movies.

== Versions ==
Three versions of the film ended up being made. Tati withdrew the original 1953 version in 1959, while a second version released in 1962 was later taken out of circulation to be held in escrow due to his 1967 bankruptcy. In 1978, Tati reissued the film; twelve minutes were trimmed, several shots were rearranged, and the film featured a new arrangement of the main theme. This version, which included new footage shot in Saint-Marc-sur-Mer, Tati described as "definitive". Only the original and 1978 versions are available on home video.
