= Sophie Tatischeff =

French film editor (1946–2001)

Sophie Catherine Tatischeff (23 October 1946 - 27 October 2001) was a French film editor and director.

Born in Neuilly-sur-Seine, Tatischeff was the daughter of Jacques Tati. She began her career as assistant editor on her father's 1967 film Playtime. She also edited both Trafic (1971) and Parade (1974).

After Tati's death she produced a colour version of his 1949 feature Jour de fête using previously unusable colour film elements shot simultaneously with the monochrome stock. In 2001, she also re-constructed his 1978 short film Forza Bastia.

Tatischeff died in Paris from lung cancer in 2001.

== Filmography ==
- Un Flic (1972, assistant editor)
- Degustation Maison (1976, director)
- Le Comptoir (1997, director)
