= The Kerry Dance =

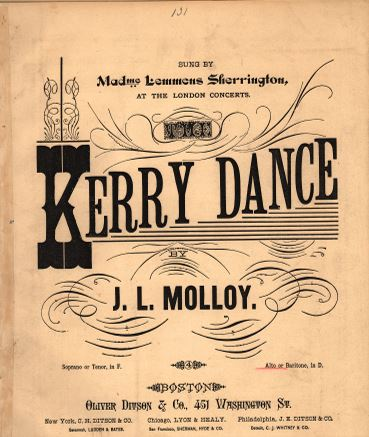
- Cover of 1880s sheet music

Song
- Published: 1879
- Songwriter: James Lynam Molloy

The Kerry Dance or Oh, the days of the Kerry dancing, is a sentimental song written in the Irish folk tradition with words and music by the composer James Lynam Molloy, an Irish barrister who lived from 1837-1909. Written in 1879 it is a lament that describes the reminiscences of the singer for his youth and the carefree excitement of the summer dancing with youthful companions. It also mourns the Irish society that gave the dances and music but which he feels has now gone forever. Although it is a composed piece its popularity has led it to be mistaken for a traditional piece of folk music.

The Kerry Dance was composed as a song, published in 1879 by James L. Molloy. The opening eight bars are virtually identical to The Cuckoo, written and composed by Miss Margaret Casson and published in London around 1790.

The pipes referred to would be the Irish or Uilleann pipes .

== Lyrics ==
The song has 4 verses with a chorus.

The best known first verse is as follows:-

1. Oh the days of the Kerry dancing Oh the ring of the piper’s tune Oh for one of those hours of gladness Gone, alas! like our youth, too soon. When the boys began to gather In the glen of a summer night And the Kerry piper’s tuning Made us long with wild delight.

== Notable recordings ==
- The Kerry Dance.- John McCormack 1936
- O the Days of the Kerry Dancing , Julie Andrews in the 1957 album The Lass with the Delicate Air
- The Kerry Dance 1942 Soundies Musical - Kay Lorraine.

== References in culture ==
- In his 1996 memoir Angela's Ashes, Frank McCourt recalls his mother singing The Kerry Dance when she fetches him from his friend Paddy Clohessy's home.
- In the 1953 comic film , Les Vacances de Monsieur Hulot by Jacques Tati. , it is the song that plays on the radio as Mr Hulot arrives at the Hotel.
