= Rhombus (disambiguation) =

A rhombus is a geometric shape often colloquially described as a diamond.

Rhombus may also refer to:

== Music ==
- Rhombus (band), a roots reggae band from New Zealand
- Rhombus (UK band), British gothic rock band
- Bullroarer, a musical instrument

== Other uses ==
- Reticulum, a southern constellation, once called Rhombus
- The proper name of the star Alpha Reticuli in Reticulum
- Rhombus formation, a troop formation
- Rhombus Media, a Canadian film and television production company
- Reusable Orbital Module, Booster, and Utility Shuttle (ROMBUS), a proposed reusable single-stage-to-orbit space launch vehicle

== See also ==
- Rhombic (disambiguation)
- Rhumb (disambiguation)
