= Henri Marquet =

Henri Marquet (19 June 1908 – 14 August 1980, Morlaix) was a French assistant director and screenwriter. He was co-nominated with Jacques Tati for the Academy Award for Best Original Screenplay for the film Mr. Hulot's Holiday (1953).

== Filmography ==
Year	Title	Role	Notes
1949	Jour de fête	Le boucher	uncredited
1953	Mr. Hulot's Holiday	Restaurant Patron in Striped Shirt	uncredited
