= Sainte-Sévère-sur-Indre =

- Commune
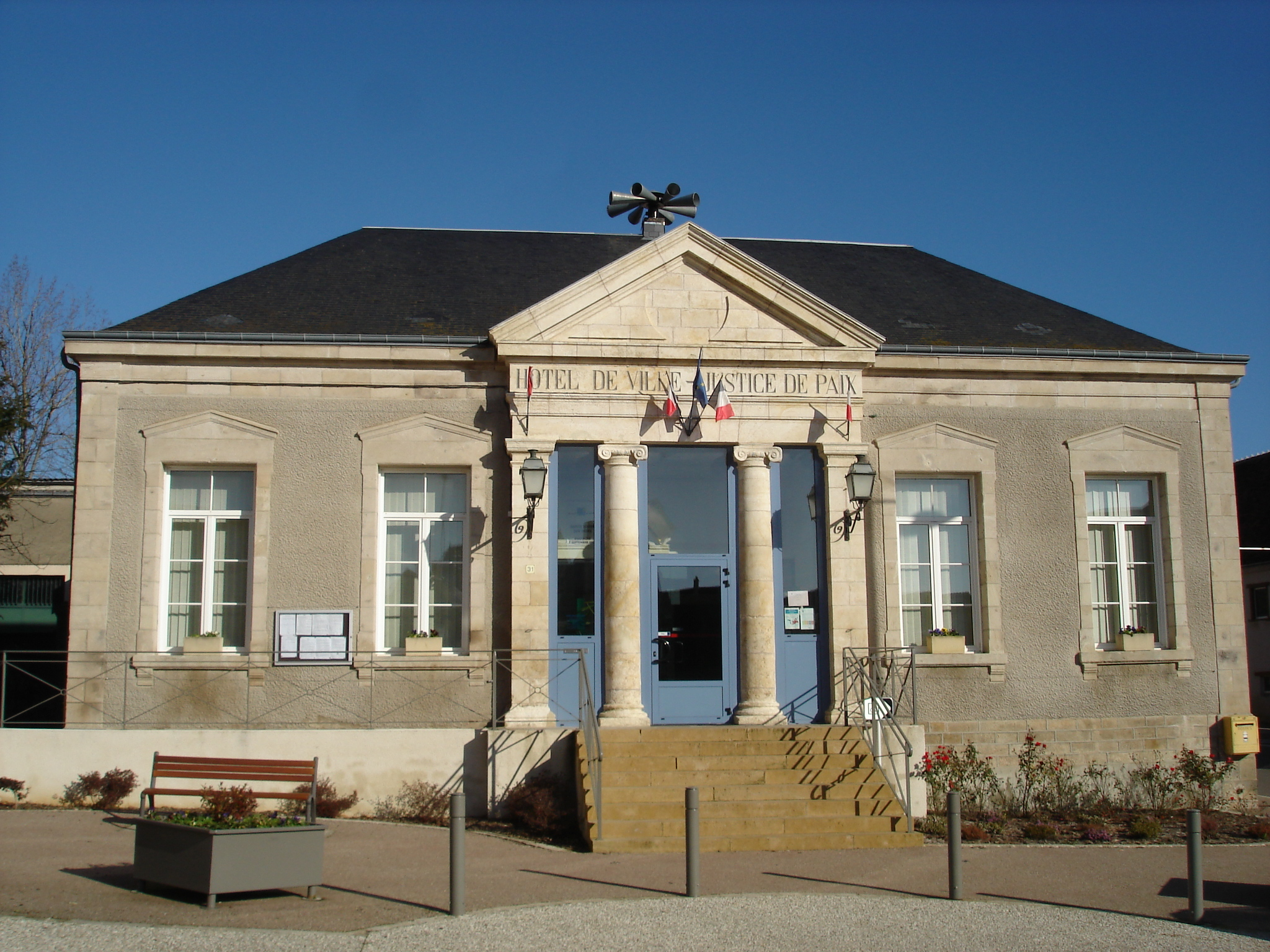
- The town hall in Sainte-Sévère-sur-Indre

- Coat of arms
- Location of Sainte-Sévère-sur-Indre
- Location within France Location within Centre-Val de Loire
- Coordinates: 46°29′15″N 2°04′19″E
- Country: France
- Region: Centre-Val de Loire
- Department: Indre
- Arrondissement: La Châtre
- Canton: La Châtre

Government
  - Mayor (2020–2026): François Daugeron
- Area^{1}: 26.03 km^{2} (10.05 sq mi)
- Elevation: 307 m (1,007 ft)
- Highest elevation: 342 m (1,122 ft)
- Lowest elevation: 222 m (728 ft)
- Population (2023): 778
  - Density: 29.9/km^{2} (77.4/sq mi)
- Time zone: UTC+01:00 (CET)
  - Summer (DST): UTC+02:00 (CEST)
- INSEE/Postal code: 36208 /36160
- ^{1} French Land Register data, which excludes lakes, ponds, glaciers > 1 km^{2} (0.386 sq mi or 247 acres) and river estuaries.

Sainte-Sévère-sur-Indre (French pronunciation: [sɛ̃t sevɛʁ syʁ ɛ̃dʁ], literally Sainte-Sévère on Indre) is a commune in the Indre department in central France. It is situated near the source of the river Indre.

The town was featured in the movie Jour de fête (1949) by Jacques Tati, which tells of a small amusement fair in a town and of the adventures of a rural postman. The fairground scenes were shot in the old town square, and many of the local inhabitants were given roles as extras.

== Population ==
Historical population
Year	Pop.	±% p.a.
1968	1,032	—
1975	1,034	+0.03%
1982	1,039	+0.07%
1990	939	−1.26%
1999	899	−0.48%
2007	865	−0.48%
2012	829	−0.85%
2017	776	−1.31%
2023	778	+0.04%
Source: INSEE

== See also ==
- Communes of the Indre department
