= Forza Bastia =

- Directed by: Jacques Tati
- Release date: 2002
- Running time: 26 minutes
- Country: France

"Forza Bastia" is a 26-minute film documenting a UEFA Cup match between PSV Eindhoven and French club SC Bastia at the Furiani Stadium in 1978. Jacques Tati directed the piece at the request of friend Gilberto Trigano – the President of the Bastia club at that time. It was subsequently shelved and kept in storage until Tati's daughter Sophie Tatischeff eventually assembled the footage, which was broadcast on French TV in 2000 and 2002.
