= Suzanne Baron =

French film editor

- Born: June 18, 1927; Nice, France
- Died: December 20, 1995 (aged 68)
- Occupation: Film editor

Suzanne Baron (June 18, 1927 - December 20, 1995) was a French film editor active from the 1950s through the 1990s. She edited her first film in 1952. Baron is known for her collaborations with filmmakers like Louis Malle and Werner Herzog.

== Selected filmography ==
- Das Versprechen (1994)
- Scream of Stone (1991)
- Anna Göldin, letzte Hexe (1991)
- Je suis fou, je suis sot, je suis méchant (1990)
- Crackers (1984)
- Circle of Deceit (1981)
- My Dinner with Andre (1981)
- Atlantic City (1980)
- The Tin Drum (1979)
- Mon coeur est rouge (1976)
- The Acrobat (1976)
- Black Moon (1975)
- Place de la République (1974)
- Humain, trop humain (1974)
- Lacombe, Lucien (1974)
- George Who? (1973)
- A Free Woman (1972)
- Jaune le soleil (1971)
- Murmur of the Heart (1971)
- Calcutta (1969)
- Un soir, un train (1968)
- Thursday We Shall Sing Like Sunday (1967)
- The Man Who Had His Hair Cut Short (1966)
- Viva Maria! (1965)
- The Fire Within (1963)
- To Die in Madrid (1963)
- Le temps du ghetto (1961)
- Vacances en enfer (1961)
- Mon Oncle (1958)
- Fantaisie d'un jour (1955)
- The Living Bread (1955)
- Monsieur Hulot's Holiday (1953)
- The Girl in the Bikini (1952)
