= Trafic =

1971 French - Italian film

- Original French release poster
- Directed by: Jacques Tati
- Written by: Jacques Tati; Jacques Lagrange; Bert Haanstra
- Produced by: Robert Dorfmann
- Starring: Jacques Tati; Tony Knepper; Franco Ressel; Mario Zanuelli; Maria Kimberly
- Cinematography: Eduard van der Enden; Marcel Weiss
- Edited by: Jacques Tati; Maurice Laumain; Sophie Tatischeff
- Music by: Charles Dumont
- Production companies: Les Films Corona; Les Films Gibé; Selenia Cinematografica
- Distributed by: Variety Distribution
- Release date: 16 April 1971 (France)
- Running time: 96 minutes
- Countries: Italy; France
- Languages: French; Dutch; English

Trafic (Traffic) is a 1971 comedy film directed by Jacques Tati. Trafic was the last film to feature Tati's famous character of Monsieur Hulot, and followed the vein of earlier Tati films that lampooned modern society.

Tati's use of the word "trafic" instead of the usual French word for car traffic (la circulation) may derive from a desire to use the same franglais he used when he called his previous film Playtime, and the primary meaning of trafic is "exchange of goods", rather than "traffic" per se. The word "Trafic" was subsequently used for a light utility vehicle model manufactured by Renault starting in 1981.

== Plot ==
Monsieur Hulot is a bumbling automobile designer who works for Altra, a Paris auto plant. He is tasked to transport a new camper-car of his design to an international auto show in Amsterdam. He is accompanied by Marcel, a truck driver, and Maria, an American publicity agent. During their drive, the transport truck has a flat tire and Hulot humorously replaces it near the edge of the road. Shortly after, the truck runs out of fuel. Hulot retrieves fuel from a nearby gas station. They stop at another gas station, where attendants hand out busts of historical figures to customers.

Meanwhile, Maria arrives at the auto show but drives back. The truck is fixed, and Hulot meets Maria along the way. The truck drives through customs along the Belgium–Netherlands border without stopping. Customs agents alert the police, and the truck is impounded by the police along a freeway, who are suspicious that it has been stolen. At the police station, Hulot and Marcel display the camper-car's innovative features to the officers, including a pullout tent in the back and a grille that becomes a barbecue grill. While they are impressed, the officers do not allow the truck to leave. The next morning, Hulot, Marcel, and Maria retrieve the correct paperwork and the truck is permitted to leave.

Back on the freeway, the truck is involved in a traffic-circle chain-reaction accident. Hulot helps a drunk elderly man who has crashed his car and returns him home to his wife. By nighttime, the truck is taken to a garage on the countryside for repair. There, some teenaged pranksters steal Maria's fluffy dog and place a similar appearing faux fur jacket underneath her sports car, making her think her pet has been killed. Hulot realizes the joke and Maria locates her real dog. The men watch the Apollo 11 moon-landing on television, causing further delays in repairing the truck.

After a few days, the truck is back on the road. However, when they arrive at the auto show, they learn the event is over. Despite the camper-car not arriving on time, the Altra director is enraged he has been charged an electric bill for 300,000 francs. Hulot plays around with a DAF 55 and is fired by the director.

In the parking lot, Marcel has unloaded the camper-car and a crowd has gathered making orders. Marcel shouts that the camper-car is a success. Unfazed by this, Hulot walks with Maria to the subway station. Within the crowd, Hulot gets separated from Maria and he heads downstairs. He is then forced back upstairs by commuters heading in the opposite direction. Hulot ends up back in her arms, where they walk off together in a parking lot full of identical umbrellas and nearly identical cars on a rainy day.

== Cast ==
- Jacques Tati as Monsieur Hulot
- Tony Knepper as Mechanic
- Franco Ressel
- Mario Zanuelli
- Maria Kimberly as Maria
- Marcel Fraval as Truck driver
- Honoré Bostel as ALTRA director
- F. Maisongrosse as François

== Reception ==
Judith Crist of New York magazine wrote in her review: "Jacques Tati's Traffic is so non-blockbuster, in fact, that it is absolutely therapeutic for today's moviegoer, a velvet-gloved healing hand from the past to remind us of children's laughter and adults' smiles of satisfaction at the comedy that had indeed evoked their laughter at first sight." Vincent Canby of The New York Times called Trafic "a very merry sort of film, but the amusement we share is Tati's, not Hulot's, a fact that may seem cold and unsettling to those who insist on mixing two parts of tears with every 10 parts of laughter." Roger Ebert gave the film 3 1/2 stars out of four, praising Tati for creating humorous incidents that "are so involved they're almost impossible to describe, but Hulot copes with them with good nature and never loses his philosophical equilibrium." The film theorist Michel Chion wrote: "Trafic turns out to be as impure a patchwork as Play Time was pure and intransigent. Nonetheless, it is an endearing film for different reasons: we are invited to a picaresque journey of a man who leaves Paris to go to Amsterdam for a car show, but arrives much too late to participate."

Jonathan Romney, in his Criterion Collection essay, felt "Tati certainly appears less in control than in the vast coordinated ballet of Play Time. For the most part, the jokes in Trafic drum up a sense of languid, almost apathetic chaos (note the distracted workers at the Altra workshop), without there always being conventional payoffs to give the comic business a sense of purpose." Gary Giddins disagreed with Romney's assessment in his book Warning Shadows, writing that he believes Trafic to have been "transcendent," as well as "misperceived" and "neglected." Another review felt Trafic was "slow going, and even devoted fans will wonder whether they're there yet."

== Home media ==
The film was released on DVD by The Criterion Collection on 15 July 2008, in a special edition double-disc set, and on Blu-ray on 28 October 2014 as a part of The Complete Jacques Tati.
