= 23S rRNA (uracil747-C5)-methyltransferase =

Class of enzymes

23S rRNA (uracil^{747}-C^{5})-methyltransferase

Identifiers
- EC no.: 2.1.1.189

Databases
- IntEnz: IntEnz view
- BRENDA: BRENDA entry
- ExPASy: NiceZyme view
- KEGG: KEGG entry
- MetaCyc: metabolic pathway
- PRIAM: profile
- PDB structures: RCSB PDB PDBe PDBsum
Search
- PMC: articles
- PubMed: articles
- NCBI: proteins

23S rRNA (uracil^{747}-C^{5})-methyltransferase (EC 2.1.1.189, YbjF, RumB, RNA uridine methyltransferase B) is an enzyme with systematic name S-adenosyl-L-methionine:23S rRNA (uracil^{747}-C^{5})-methyltransferase. This enzyme catalyses the following chemical reaction

S-adenosyl-L-methionine + uracil^{747} in 23S rRNA $\rightleftharpoons$ S-adenosyl-L-homocysteine + 5-methyluracil^{747} in 23S rRNA

The enzyme specifically methylates uracil^{747} at C^{5} in 23S rRNA.
