= Rhombic =

Rhombic may refer to:

- Rhombus, a quadrilateral whose four sides all have the same length (often called a diamond)
- Rhombic antenna, a broadband directional antenna most commonly used on shortwave frequencies
- polyhedra formed from rhombuses, such as the rhombic dodecahedron or the rhombic triacontahedron or the rhombic dodecahedral honeycomb or the rhombic icosahedron or the rhombic hexecontahedron or the rhombic enneacontahedron or the trapezo-rhombic dodecahedron
- other things that exhibit the shape of a rhombus, such as rhombic tiling, Rhombic Chess, rhombic drive, Rhombic Skaapsteker, rhombic egg eater, rhombic night adder, forest rhombic night adder
