= Gai dimanche =

Gai dimanche!
- Directed by: Jacques Berr
- Written by: Jacques Tati; Rhum
- Starring: Rhum; Jacques Tati
- Release date: 1935
- Running time: 22 minutes
- Country: France
- Language: French

Gai dimanche! (Fun Sunday!) is a 1935 three reel film written by and starring Jacques Tati and his friend Rhum. The pair star as down-and-outs who try to generate funds by providing an impromptu leisure tour in a rickety bus they wrangle use of for free. Released in 1935 and rarely seen today, the film offers brief glimpses and hints towards methods Tati would begin to perfect in his films more than a decade later. The short was included in the Criterion Collection's "The Complete Jacques Tati" box set, in a disc containing several short films that Tati either directed or starred in.
