= Monsieur Hulot =

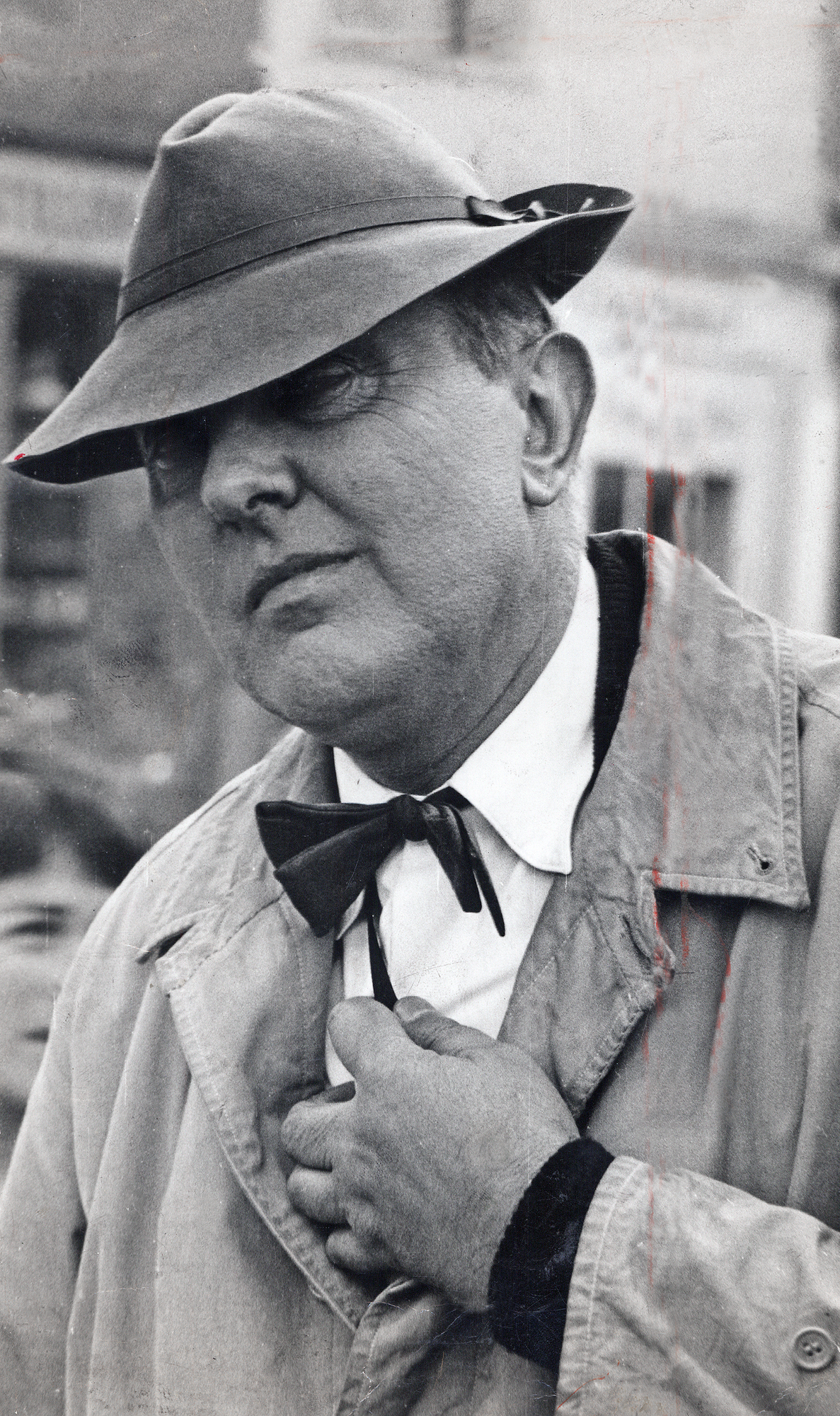
- Jacques Tati as Hulot, c. 1959
- First appearance: Les Vacances de Monsieur Hulot (1953)
- Last appearance: Trafic (1971)
- Created by: Jacques Tati
- Portrayed by: Jacques Tati

In-universe information
- Gender: Male
- Nationality: French

Monsieur Hulot (English: /uːloʊ/ yoo-LOH, French: [məsjø ylo]) is a character created and played by French comic Jacques Tati for a series of films in the 1950s through the early '70s, namely Les Vacances de Monsieur Hulot (1953), Mon Oncle (1958), Playtime (1967) and Trafic (1971). The character of Hulot (although played by another actor) also appears briefly in François Truffaut's Bed & Board (1970).

== Physical description and behavior ==
He is recognized by his overcoat, pipe and hat, and his distinctive lurching walk. He is clumsy and somewhat naive of the evolving world around him, but still has a friendly, well-meaning, and good-natured persona. His escapades usually involved clashes with technology and the problems of living in an increasingly impersonal and gadgetized world. In Trafic, Hulot, the designer of a new camper-car, "struggles valiantly... against the perpetual roadblocks of cars, policemen, bureaucrats and just people".

== Influence from the Tramp ==
The name of "Monsieur Hulot" is believed to echo "Charlot," the French name for Charlie Chaplin's character The Tramp. However, "Hulot is more distracted than the Tramp, he cannot disentangle himself from situations as effortlessly, and he is not as central a character, he is not 'the reason for the film.'" As theorized by David Bellos, Hulot may even represent an inversion of The Tramp: "Hulot tilts forwards whereas Chaplin tilts back; Chaplin's puppet-like waddle is very different from Hulot's 'springy glide'; and there is a difference in costume too: the bowler, tails, huge pants, cane and cigarette are replaced by a pipe, various accessories, pants that are too short, a sports blazer and a Homburg, although the striped socks are borrowed from Keaton."

Of Hulot, Jacques Tati remarked that he is "tall, and he cannot hide – he cannot conceal himself behind a lamppost or anything else – whereas Chaplin could hide behind a small trash can, leave his hat on the can, then sneak behind another small can, while making people believe that he was still in back of the first one, whereupon he would come back to grab his hat. Hulot, by contrast, has the stature of a rather steady or stand-up guy; he behaves exactly like any man from Paris or even from the provinces.”

== Illusion of familiarity and tendency to be overlooked by others ==
Film critic Michel Chion has written that:

Hulot is the guy you recognize because he was in the same barracks as you, even though he never became a close friend. He gives you the illusion of familiarity, which really doesn't exist. He develops into a real person only when you bump into him by accident one night... By creating Hulot, Tati aims to re-establish a distance. From the start, Hulot is someone who exists only in the eyes and mouths of the beholder. He is someone who awakens suspicion or amused attention... Hulot is a blurred man, a passer-by, a Hulotus errans.

This view is shared by Roger Ebert, who, in his review of Les Vacances de Monsieur Hulot, states that Hulot "is friendly to a fault, but he is the man nobody quite sees. The holidaymakers are distracted by their own worlds, companions, and plans, and notice Hulot only when something goes wrong, as it often does."

== Influence on Mr. Bean ==
English comedian Rowan Atkinson has cited Hulot as an influence for his character, Mr. Bean. The Kids in the Hall recurring character M. Piedlourde ("Mr. Heavyfoot") has also been compared to Hulot.

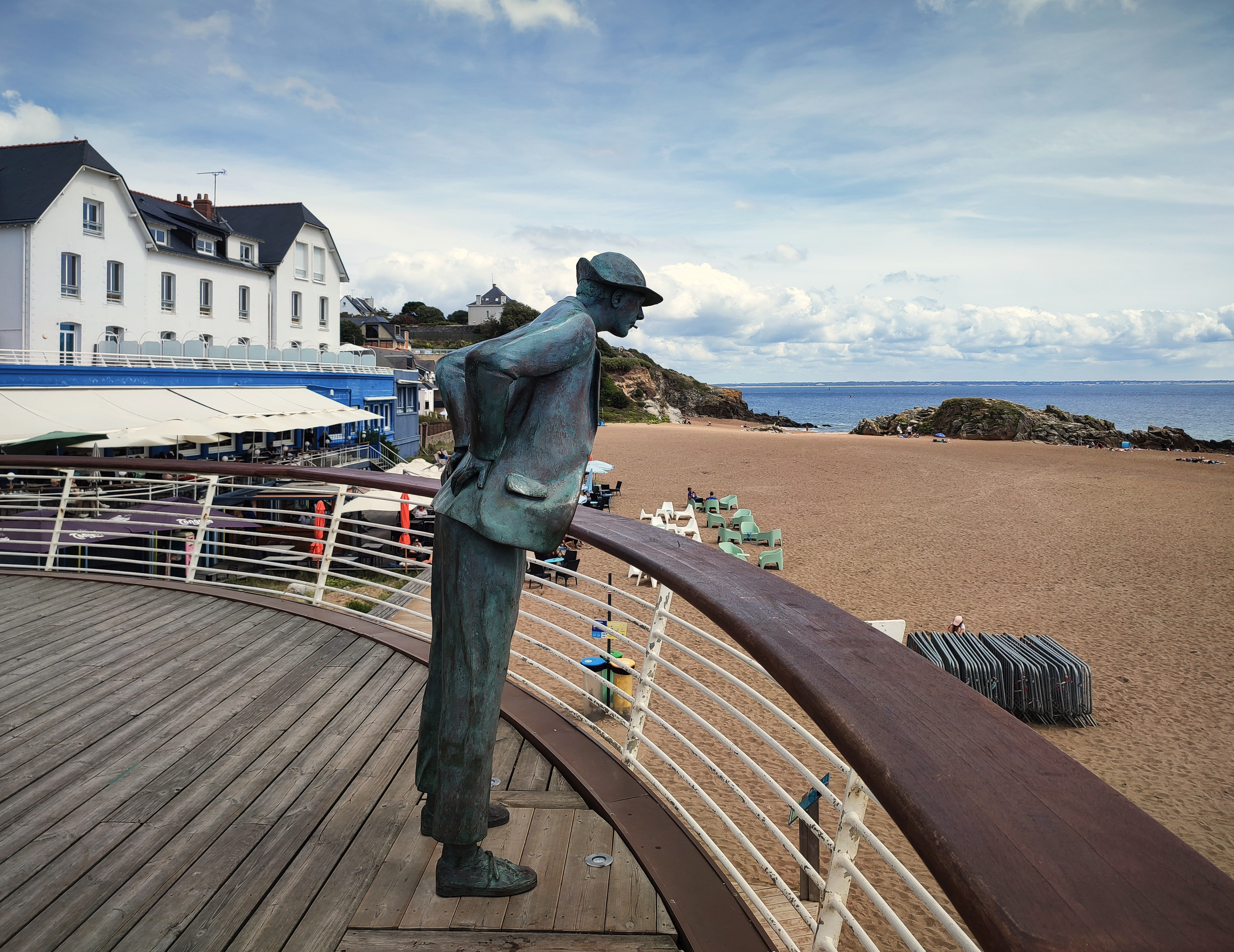
Statue of Mr. Hulot in Saint-Marc-sur-Mer
