= Jour de fête =

- Directed by: Jacques Tati
- Written by: Henri Marquet; René Wheeler; Jacques Tati
- Produced by: André Paulvé; Fred Orain
- Starring: Guy Decomble; Jacques Tati; Paul Frankeur
- Cinematography: Jacques Mercanton; Jacques Sauvageot
- Edited by: Marcel Morreau
- Music by: Jean Yatove
- Distributed by: DisCina
- Release date: May 4, 1949 (France)
- Running time: 87 minutes (black-and-white version); 78 minutes (color version)
- Country: France
- Language: French

Jour de fête (The Big Day) is a 1949 French comedy film starring Jacques Tati in his feature film directorial debut as an inept and easily distracted mailman in a backward French village. Shot largely in and around Sainte-Sévère-sur-Indre, where Tati had lived during the Occupation, most of the actors were unknown and villagers served as extras.

== Plot ==
On a public holiday, a young boy watches a travelling fair arrive in his village of Sainte-Sévère-sur-Indre, near the centre of France. Among the locals is François, the amiable and bumbling mailman, whom everybody likes but nobody takes seriously. Marcel and Roger, the two men running the fair, make him their butt and get him drunk. In the cinema tent, people watch a spoof documentary that contrasts the unbelievable efficiency of the US post office with the antiquated French PTT. They decide that François must get up to date and, although he only has a bicycle, must start using transatlantic dash in his delivery. In the end, exhausted by his frantic efforts, he stops to help a family pitchfork their new-mown hay into a horse-drawn cart, while the boy from the opening scene completes the deliveries on François's route.

== Cast ==
- Jacques Tati as François
- Paul Frankeur as Marcel
- Guy Decomble as Roger

== Themes ==
In Jour de fête, several characteristics of Tati's work appear for the first time in a full-length film. Largely a visual comedy in the silent tradition, dialogue is used at times to tell part of the story and an ancient woman with a goat appears sibyl-like on occasions as a commentator. Music is mostly diegetic, coming from the carousel, the village brass band, and the pianola in the bar. Sound effects are a vital element, with imaginative use of voices and other background noises, particularly of birds, to provide both ambiance and humor.

Giving a sympathetic portrayal of what was already a vanishing way of life, where the villagers do not yet have cars or tractors and water comes from the pump, the film introduces what would be a key theme of Tati's films. Instead of rounded individuals rooted in communities, changes in Western society were turning people into operators of technology and consumers of its products. Though much of this trend originated in the US, France was catching up fast. Critics have noted how Tati turns the human body, with its inbuilt limitations, into a form of machine that performs tasks.

A hidden factor in this and following films is that the old world of rural France is shown as one of curves, in space and in time, with people and their livestock following fluid relaxed routines, while the new world modelled on the USA operates on straight lines in rigid timeframes, symbolised by François literally cutting corners to speed up his round.

== Production ==
The movie was originally filmed in both black-and-white and Thomsoncolor, an early and untried color film process. In using both formats, Tati feared that Thomsoncolor might not be practical, a well-founded concern when the firm proved unable to complete the processing. A colour version has subsequently been released, with a prologue detailing the failure of the original colour recording and asserting that the new version is in accordance with the director's intentions. This version is in fact the work of Sophie Tatischeff, editor and daughter of Jacques Tati, and François Ede, cinematographer, who meticulously edited and restored the film from the original camera negative which had been preserved and stored away for years. The optical system device that allowed the restitution of the colors was restored and allowed, more than forty years after the shooting, to produce the original colors of the film.

== Release ==
=== Theatrical ===
Over 7 million tickets for Jour de fête had been sold in French cinemas up to 2015, making it one of the top 40 most popular French films of all time.

=== Critical reception ===
On Rotten Tomatoes, the film holds an approval rating of 100% based on 21 reviews, with a weighted average rating of 8.4/10.

== Home release ==
There are three versions of the movie available:

- The original version from 1949, running at 87 minutes. This version is completely black and white.
- The re-edited version by Tati from 1964, running at 80 minutes. This mostly black and white version inserts some extra footage of a painter and some colorized imagery, while removing some other scenes.
- The restored version from 1995 in color, running at 77 minutes. This version, restored by Tati's daughter, is an attempt to finish the original Thomsoncolor version. For parts where that was deemed impossible, colorized frames were used instead.

The BFI Blu-Ray release includes both the 1964 and 1995 versions in HD whereas The Criterion Collection release for The Complete Jacques Tati Blu-ray box set contains all three versions but the 1995 is in 1080i upscaled from an SD source.
