= Mon Oncle =

1958 film by Jacques Tati

- Theatrical release poster
- Directed by: Jacques Tati
- Written by: Jacques Tati; Jacques Lagrange (Note: Collaboration); Jean L'Hôte (Note: Assistance)
- Produced by: Jacques Tati
- Starring: Jacques Tati; Jean-Pierre Zola; Adrienne Servantie; Alain Bécourt
- Cinematography: Jean Bourgoin
- Edited by: Suzanne Baron
- Music by: Alain Romans; Franck Barcellini
- Production companies: Specta-Films; Gray-Film; Alter-Films; Film del Centauro; Cady-Films
- Distributed by: Gaumont (France); Titanus (Italy)
- Release dates: 10 May 1958 (France); 1 October 1958 (Italy)
- Running time: 120 minutes (French); 111 minutes (English)
- Countries: France; Italy
- Language: French
- Budget: FRF 250,000 (est.)

Mon Oncle (French pronunciation: [mɔ̃n‿ɔ̃kl]; transl. My Uncle) is a 1958 French-language comedy film directed by Jacques Tati. The first of Tati's films to be released in colour, (Note: Jour de fête (1949), Tati's first full-length film, was filmed in colour but released in black and white due to technical issues.) Mon Oncle won the Academy Award for Best Foreign Language Film, a Special Prize at the 1958 Cannes Film Festival, and the New York Film Critics Circle Award for Best Foreign Language Film, receiving more honours than any of Tati's other cinematic works.

The film centers on the socially awkward yet lovable character of Monsieur Hulot and his quixotic struggle with postwar France's infatuation with modern architecture, mechanical efficiency and consumerism. Like most Tati films, Mon Oncle is largely a visual comedy: colour and lighting are employed to help tell the story. The dialogue in Mon Oncle is barely audible, and largely subordinated to the role of a sound effect. The drifting noises of heated arguments and idle banter complement other sounds and the physical movements of the characters, intensifying comedic effect. The complex soundtrack also uses music to characterise environments, including a lively musical theme that represents Hulot's world of comical inefficiency and freedom.

At its debut in 1958 in France, Mon Oncle was denounced by some critics for what they viewed as a reactionary or even poujadiste view of an emerging French consumer society, which had lately embraced a new wave of industrial modernization and a more rigid social structure. However, this criticism soon gave way in the face of the film's huge popularity in France and abroad – even in the United States, where rampant discretionary consumption and a recession had caused those on both the right and the left to question the economic and social values of the era. The film was another box office success for Tati, with a total of 4,576,928 admissions in France.

== Plot ==
M. Hulot is the dreamy, impractical, and adored uncle of nine-year-old Gérard Arpel, who lives with his materialistic parents, M. and Mme. Arpel, in an ultra-modern geometric house and garden, Villa Arpel, in a new suburb of Paris, situated just beyond the crumbling stone buildings of the old neighborhoods of the city. Gérard's parents are entrenched in a machine-like existence of work, fixed gender roles, the acquisition of status through possessions, and conspicuous displays to impress guests, such as the fish-shaped fountain at the center of the garden that, in a running gag, Mme. Arpel activates only for important visitors.

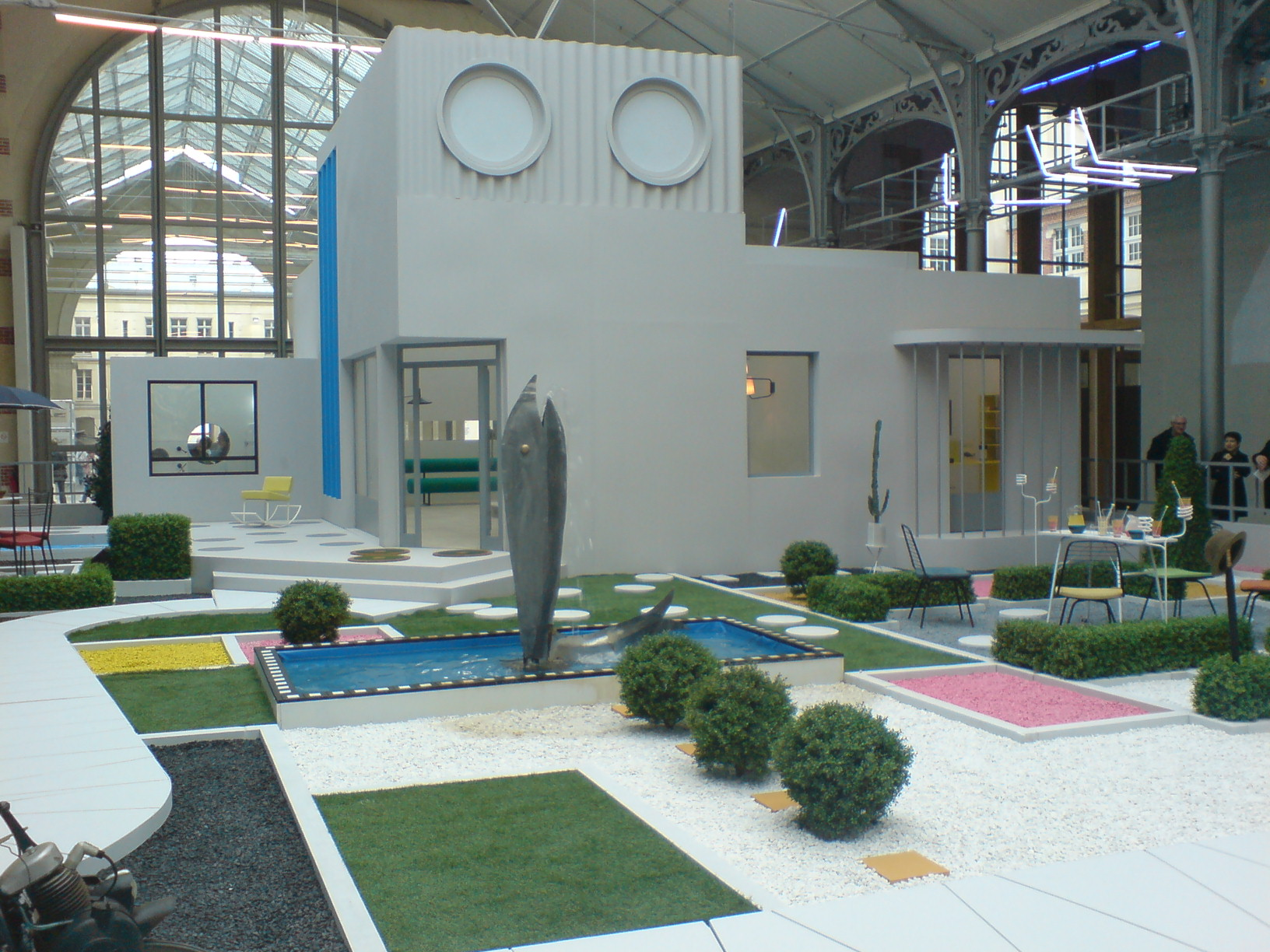
A replica of Villa Arpel at the Cent Quatre in Paris, 2009

Each element of Villa Arpel is stylistically rather than functionally designed, creating an environment completely indifferent to the comfort, or lack of comfort, of its occupants. In choosing modern architecture to punctuate his satire, Tati once stated, "Les lignes géométriques ne rendent pas les gens aimables" ("Geometrical lines do not produce likeable people"). From inconveniently located stepping stones, to difficult-to-sit-on furniture, to a kitchen filled with deafeningly loud appliances, every facet of Villa Arpel emphasizes the impracticality of a dedication to superficial aesthetics and electrical gadgets over the necessities of daily living.

Despite the superficial beauty of its modern design, the Arpels' home is entirely impersonal, as are the Arpels themselves. In fact, M. and Mme. Arpel have completely subordinated their individuality to maintain their social position and their shiny new possessions. Tati emphasises his themes surrounding the Arpel lifestyle (as well as M. Arpel's automatonic workplace, Plastac) with monochromatic shades and cloudy days.

By contrast, Monsieur Hulot lives in an old and run-down city district. He is unemployed, and gets around town either on foot or on a VéloSoleX motorised bicycle. Gérard, utterly bored by the sterility and monotony of his life with his parents, fastens himself to his uncle at every opportunity. Hulot, little more than a child himself at times, is completely at home with Gérard, but also completely ineffectual at controlling his horseplay with his school friends, who take delight in tormenting adults with practical jokes. Exasperated at their relative's perceived immaturity, the Arpels soon scheme to saddle him with the twin yokes of family and business responsibilities.

== Cast ==
- Jacques Tati as Monsieur Hulot
- Jean-Pierre Zola as Monsieur Arpel
- Adrienne Servantie as Madame Arpel
- Lucien Frégis as Monsieur Pichard
- Betty Schneider as Betty, the landlord's daughter
- Jean-François Martial as Walter
- Dominique Marie as neighbor
- Yvonne Arnaud as Georgette, the maid
- Adelaide Danieli as Madame Pichard
- Alain Bécourt as Gérard Arpel
- Régis Fontenay as braces dealer
- Claude Badolle as flea market dealer
- Max Martel as drunken man
- Nicolas Bataille as working man

== Production ==
Tati as M. Hulot

The sets for the film, designed by Jacques Lagrange, were built in 1956 at Victorine Studios (now known as Studios Riviera), near Nice, and torn down after filming was complete.

=== English-language version ===
An English version of the film, nine minutes shorter than the original and released as My Uncle, was filmed at the same time as the French-language version. There are slight differences in the staging of the scenes and in the performances. In the English-language release, French signs are replaced by ones in English; important dialogue is dubbed in English, although background voices remain in French.

== Reception ==
On the review aggregator website Rotten Tomatoes, Mon Oncle holds an approval rating of 94% based on 32 reviews, with an average rating of 8.5/10. The website's critics consensus reads, "Jacques Tati's most accessible film is a paean to gentle values and observing the small details of life." Metacritic assigned the film a weighted average score of 84 out of 100, based on 15 critics, indicating "universal acclaim".

Bosley Crowther of The New York Times said the film had a "cast of colorful and adroit supporting players, all nonprofessionals" and a "gay but somewhat monotonous musical score"; he called the film "perceptibly contrived when it lingers too long and gets too deeply into the dullness of things mechanical. After you've pushed one button and one modernistic face, you've pushed them all. Mr. Hulot [as played by Tati] is the focus of amusement, not electrical doors and machines that squeeze out plastic hose." Crowther noted that its style of humor "was done superbly more than twenty-five years ago by René Clair in À Nous la Liberté and afterward by Charlie Chaplin in Modern Times." Variety said that although it was "[s]omewhat long for a comedy, Jacques Tati's film has inventiveness, gags, warmth and a 'poetic' approach to satire"; they complemented the film's "expert blocking out of the characters, creative use of sound, and eschewing of all useless dialog."

== See also ==
- List of submissions to the 31st Academy Awards for Best Foreign Language Film
- List of French submissions for the Academy Award for Best Foreign Language Film
