= Jean Badal =

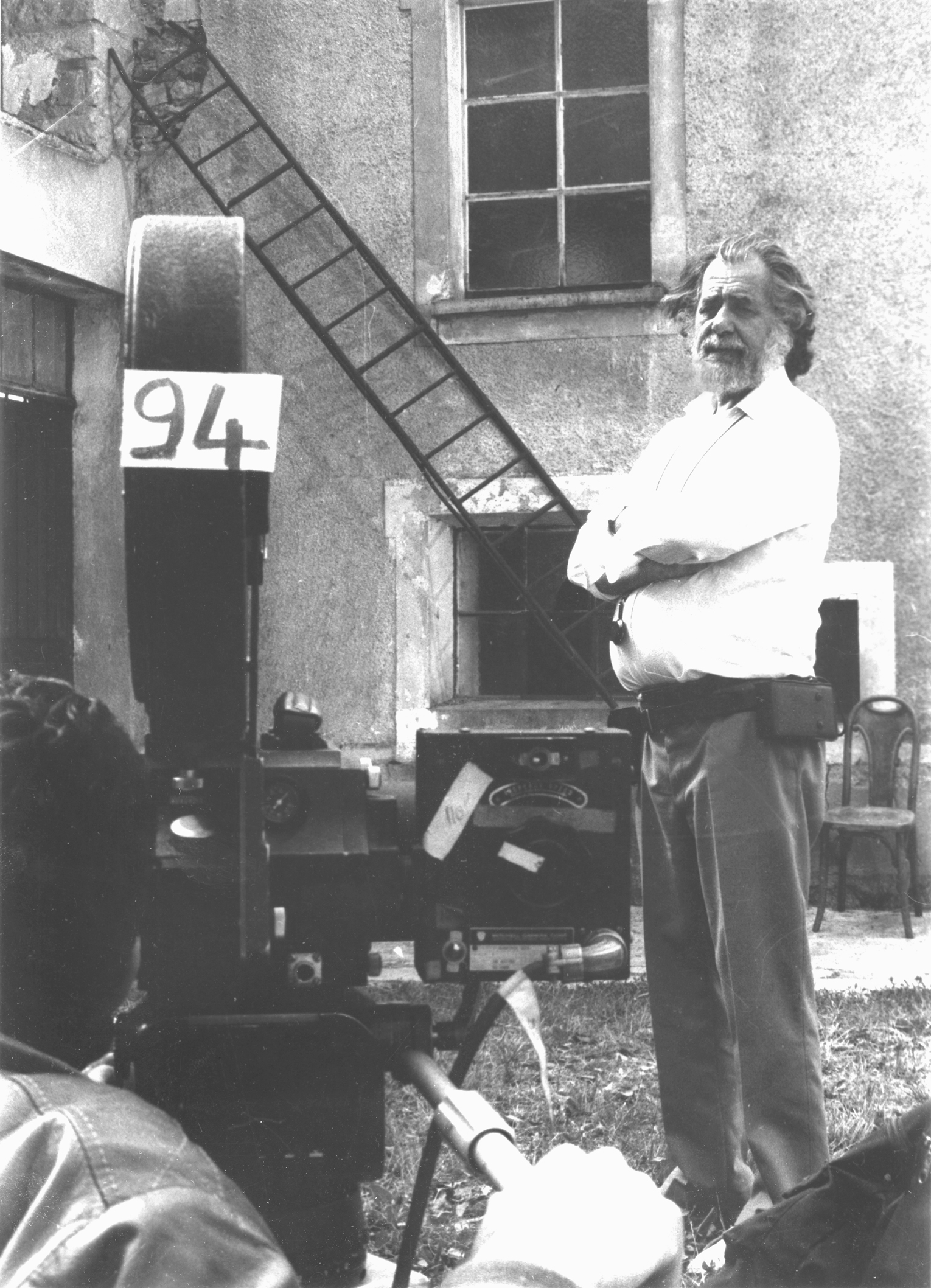
- Born: Badal János; 7 March 1927; Budapest, Hungary
- Died: 9 October 2015 (aged 88); Paris, France
- Occupation: cinematographer
- Years active: 1950-2007

Jean Badal (Hungarian: Badal János; 7 March 1927 – 9 October 2015) was a Hungarian-born French cinematographer.

== Selected filmography ==
- Rakoczy's Lieutenant (1954)
- Love Travels by Coach (1955)
- Leila and Gábor (1956)
- By Order of the Emperor (1957)
- Sunday Romance (1957)
- Les Assassins de l'ordre (1971)
