= Citroën GS =

Citroën GS/GSA
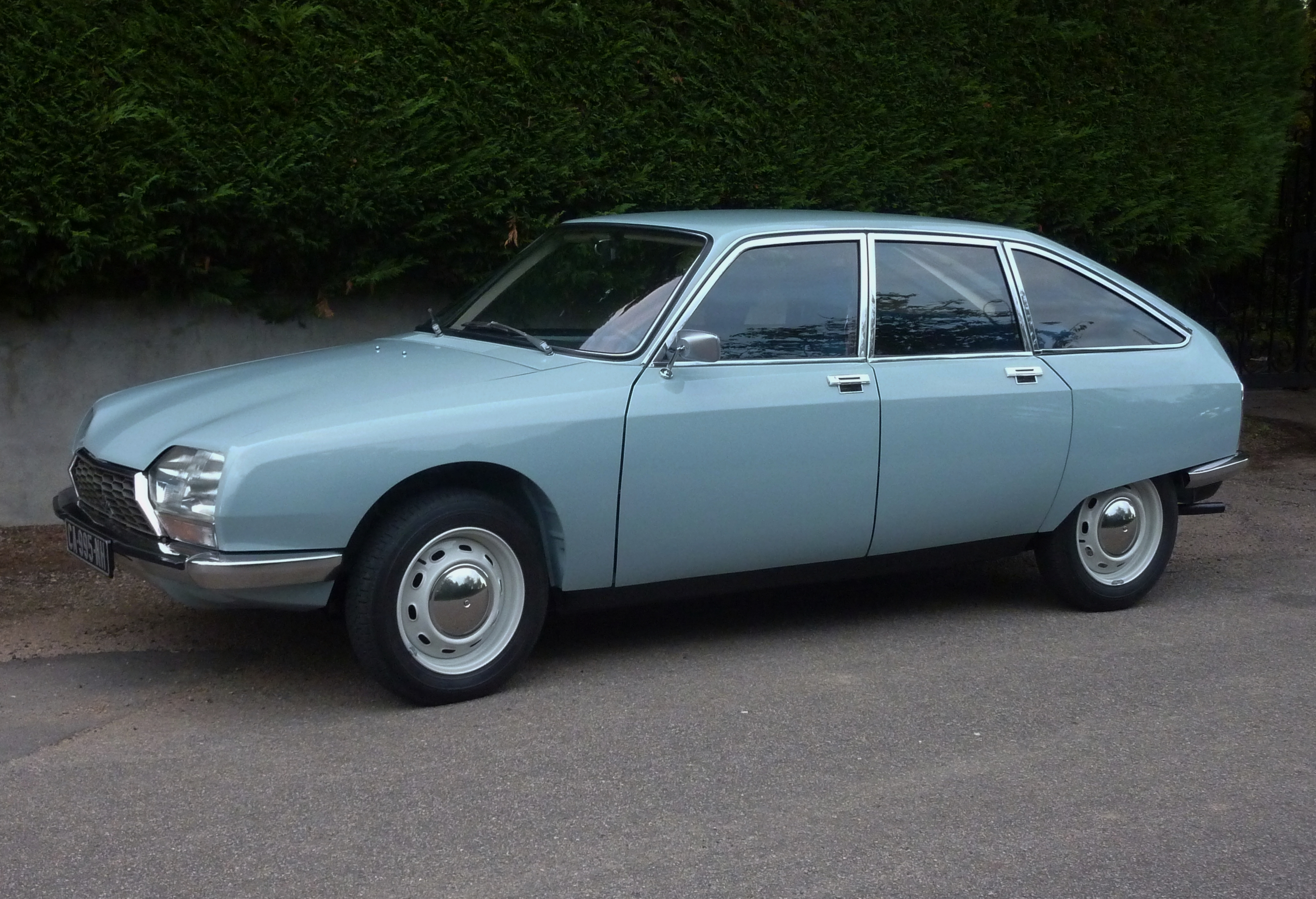
- Citroën GS

Overview
- Manufacturer: Citroën
- Also called: Citroën GSX
- Production: 1970–1986
- Assembly: France: Rennes (Rennes plant); Chile: Arica; Indonesia: Jakarta (Gaya Motor); Mozambique; Portugal: Mangualde (Mangualde plant); Spain: Vigo (Vigo plant); South Africa: Port Elizabeth; Thailand: Bangkok; Yugoslavia: Koper (Cimos); Zimbabwe: Mutare
- Designer: Robert Opron

Body and chassis
- Class: Small family car (C)
- Body style: 4-door fastback 5-door hatchback 5-door estate 3-door van
- Layout: Front-engine, front-wheel-drive

Powertrain
- Engine: 1,015 cc air-cooled H4; 1,129 cc air-cooled H4; 1,222 cc air-cooled H4; 1,299 cc air-cooled H4; 995 cc twin-rotor

Dimensions
- Wheelbase: 2,550 mm (100.4 in)
- Length: 4,120–4,180 mm (162.2–164.6 in)
- Width: 1,600–1,620 mm (63.0–63.8 in)
- Height: 1,350 mm (53.1 in)
- Curb weight: 900 kg (1,984 lb) (saloon); 950 kg (2,094 lb) (hatchback); 925 kg (2,039 lb) (3-door van) (all weights approximate)

Chronology
- Successor: Citroën BX and Citroën ZX

The Citroën GS is a small family car manufactured and marketed by Citroën from 1970 to 1986 across two series. From 1970 to 1979 it was built as a fastback four-door saloon car and as a five-door estate car. A revised version, the GSA, was produced from late 1979 until 1986 in five-door hatchback or estate body styles – the latter after a facelift. Combined production reached approximately 2.5 million. It has a front-engine, front-wheel-drive layout and has seating for five passengers.

Noted for its aerodynamic body shape with a drag coefficient of 0.318, fully independent hydro-pneumatic brakes and self-levelling suspension, and air-cooled flat-four engine, the GS was styled by Robert Opron, with a low nose, a two-box silhouette, semi-enclosed rear wheels and a sharply vertical Kamm-tail.

When the GS was named the European Car of the Year for 1971, the design was noted as technologically advanced, with class leading comfort, safety and aerodynamics.

== Market placement ==
The GS filled the gap in Citroën's range, between the 2CV and Ami economy cars and the luxurious DS executive sedan. The DS had moved significantly upmarket from its predecessor the Citroën Traction Avant, and beyond the finances of most French motorists. Leaving this market gap open for fifteen years allowed other manufacturers entry into the most profitable, high volume market segment in France. This combined with the development costs and new factory for the DS-replacing Citroën CX, the 1973/1974 oil crisis, and an aborted Wankel rotary engine, led Citroën to declare bankruptcy in 1974.

The GS met with instant market acceptance and was the largest selling Citroën model for many years. 1,896,742 GS models and 576,757 GSA models were produced in total.

Unlike the 2CV, Ami, DS and SM, the GS was never officially imported to the USA. A US export model was nearly finished when Citroën withdrew from the US market, with a few dozen cars brought over in 1971 for testing purposes and to be displayed in showrooms. After the project was cancelled, these orphaned cars were sold, mostly to employees of the dealerships.

== Design stage ==
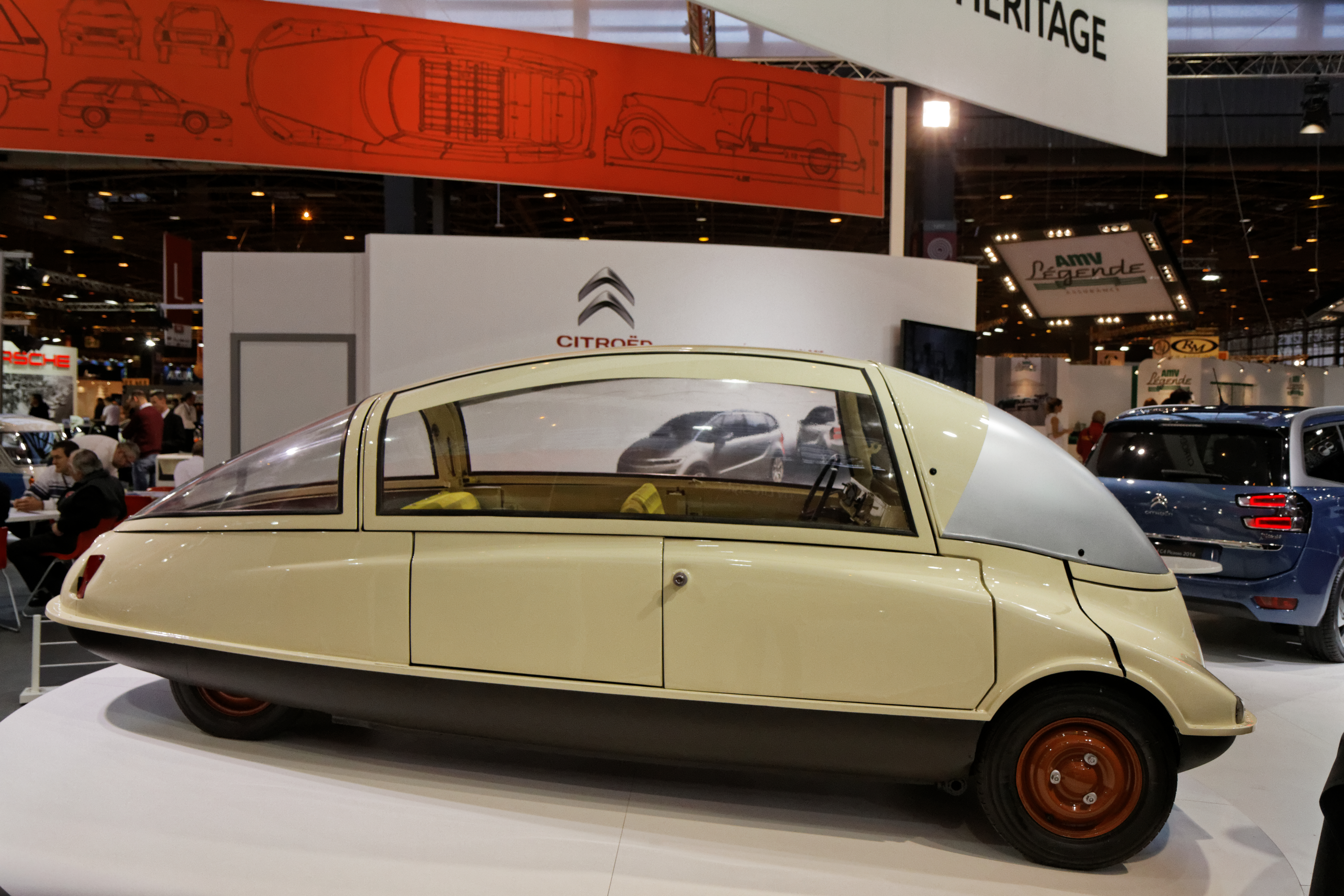
1956 C10 Prototype

In the March 1971 issue of CAR magazine, automotive journalist L.J.K. Setright noted that with the arrival of the GS, the automotive industry would have to re-evaluate its offerings, seeing what he described as a "lemming-like rush towards a sea of mediocrity…"

The GS took 14 years to develop from initial idea to launch.

The 1955 DS19 was 65% more expensive than the car it replaced, the Citroën Traction Avant, leaving a large gap in the middle range of the market.

In 1956, Citroën developed the C10, a bubble car prototype to fill the gap in its range between the large DS and the tiny 2CV. Development continued with ideas like a Wankel engine and hydropneumatic suspension suggested as possibilities, with a new, modern body to match. Another iteration was the "C60," which resembled an Ami 6 with a long, smooth nose.

In 1963, development had moved to "Project F", which was close to being production-ready. Citroën decided the car was too similar to the 1965 Renault 16 and by 1967 Project F was suspended. Many of the mechanical components continued to "Project G", which became the GS. The GS was designed by Robert Opron, with a smooth two box design that bears some resemblance to the 1967 design study by Pininfarina Berlina Aerodinamica.

== Launch and ongoing development ==
On 24 August 1970, Citroën launched the GS. The body style was as a fastback-style berline (a four-door saloon with three side windows) with a sharp kammback. The aerodynamics gave one of the best drag coefficients of any vehicle at the time. On its launch, its main competitors in Europe included the Fiat 128, Ford Escort, Renault 6 and Vauxhall Viva.

The GS's aerodynamics enabled the car to make the best of the available power, but when introduced, the car was considered underpowered. In September 1972 Citroën addressed the issue with the introduction of an optional 1,222 cc engine. Claimed power increased from 55.5 PS (41 kW; 55 bhp) to 60 PS (44 kW; 59 bhp), with torque improving from 7.2 to 8.9 kg⋅m (71 to 87 N⋅m; 52 to 64 lb⋅ft). Both the second gear and final drive ratios were adjusted, increasing the vehicle speed per 1,000 rpm from 23 km/h (14.3 mph) to 24.5 km/h (15.2 mph). Larger front brake discs were also fitted.

From a design perspective, CEO Pierre Bercot considered a hatchback layout too utilitarian. The GS's initial fastback design, with a separate trunk/boot, was controversial, though the 1974 CX shared a similar configuration. The trunk/boot was nevertheless large, in part due to the positioning of the spare wheel within the engine compartment.

From September 1971, the GS was also available as a five-door station wagon (estate) and a similar two-door "service" van. Citroën also explored the idea of a two-door coupé or three-door hatchback version of the GS, with a number of prototypes being built, but none entering production. The most well known was the 1972 Citroën GS Camargue, designed by Bertone. Proposals by Heuliez, Ligier, and Citroën’s own BEA were also built and presented.

Both the early GS (until 1976) and the GSA were fitted with a rotating drum speedometer (similar in construction to bathroom scales), rather than the dials found in a conventional instrument panel. The later GS (from 1977 until the introduction of the GSA) had a conventional speedometer

The GS's radio was placed between the seats, and the parking brake was located on the dashboard. Adjacent to the radio was a suspension height adjustment lever. The steering wheel was single-spoke design, minimizing its potential intrusion on the driver in the event of an impact. On the later GSA, controls were organized in flanking satellites and a diagram of the car provided information on indicator lights or mechanical problems.

The GS was offered in four trims: G Special (base), GS Club (midrange), GS X (sports), and GS Pallas (luxury). The GS X and Pallas were only offered as saloons in most markets, although a GS Break Pallas was available in Portugal (where the Club Break was not offered).

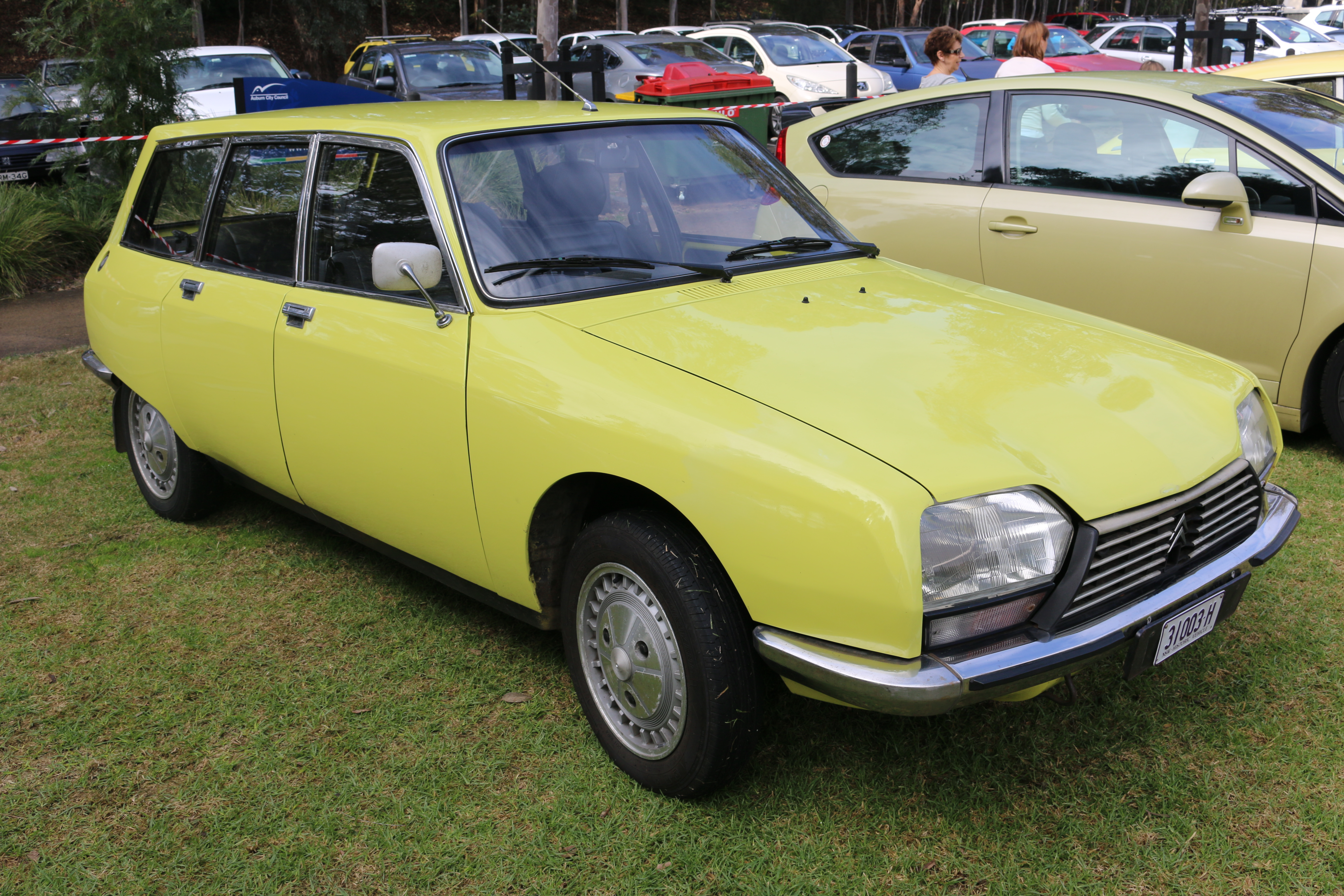
1976 Citroën GS 1220cc Club station wagon (non-original wheels)

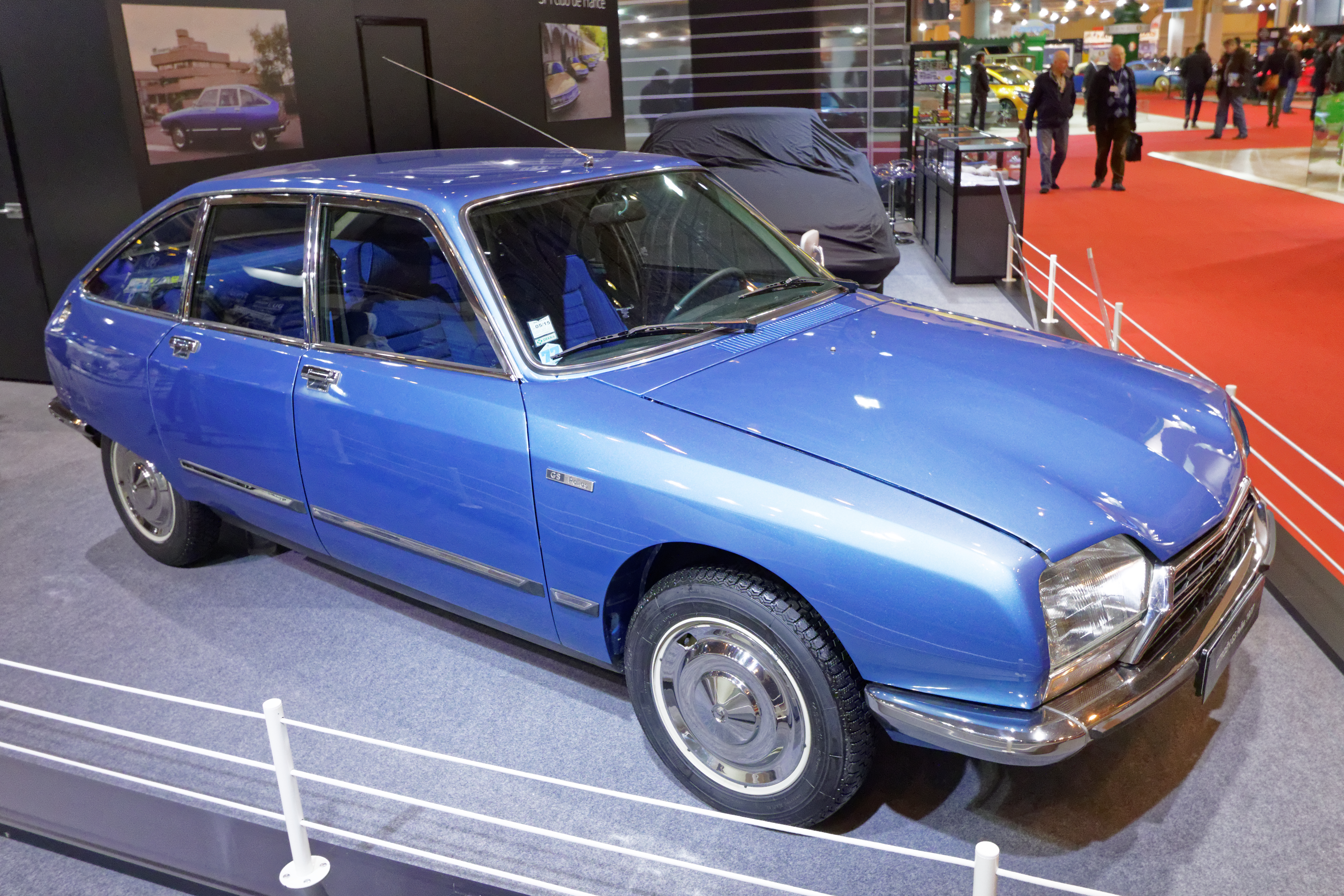
1977 GS Pallas – with full hubcaps and side protecting strips

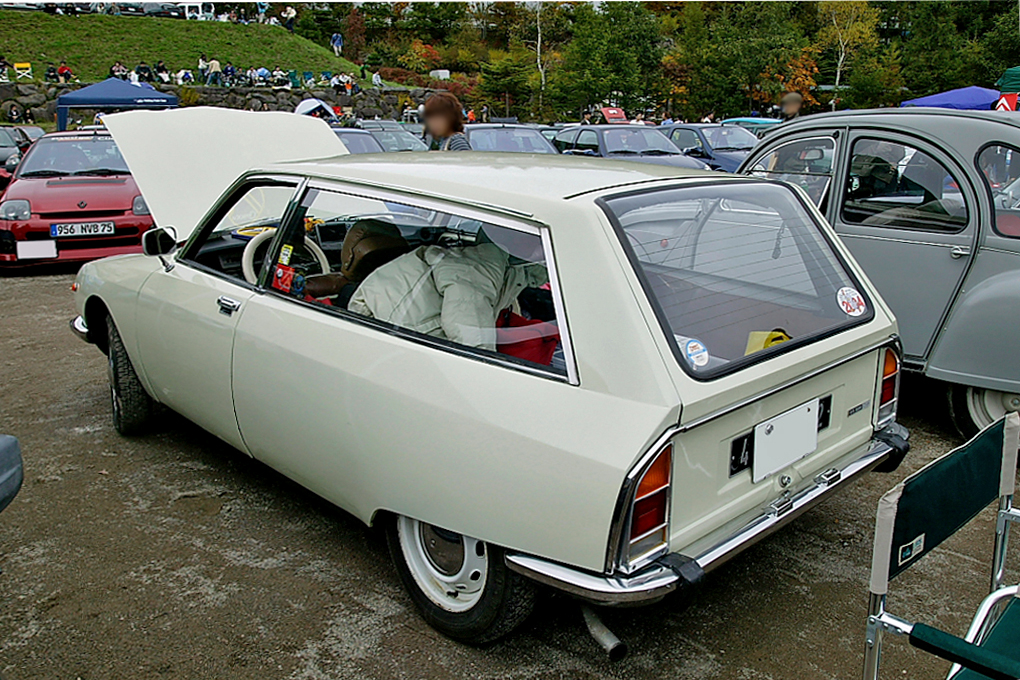
Early 1970s GS Service Van

=== GSA (1979–1986) ===
The GS was facelifted in 1979 and given a hatchback, and renamed the GSA. This change reflected the growing sales of small family hatchbacks in Europe since the launch of the Volkswagen Golf. Revisions included the grille, plastic bumpers, taillights, hubcaps, and exterior door handles. It also had a revised dashboard with the auxiliary controls on column-shaped 'satellites' so they could be reached without moving the hands from the single-spoked steering wheel; similar to the CX and Visa's layouts. To retain the car's structural rigidity, the new rear hatch kept a tall lower lip, which did make it harder to lift heavy items into the trunk. The GSA was only available with the larger, 1.3-litre engine. A new, five-speed manual gearbox was standard on the X3 and optional on the Pallas. The X3 had closer, sportier ratios while the Pallas received wider spaced ratios for better economy and quieter operation.

Contemporary journalists noted the smooth ride quality – the hydropneumatic suspension is designed to absorb bumps and ripples that would be uncomfortable in a conventionally sprung car with just a slight body movement.

The GSA was joined and gradually replaced by the larger BX in 1982, with production continuing in reduced volumes until 1986. Citroën did not return to the small family hatchback market until the launch of the ZX in 1991.

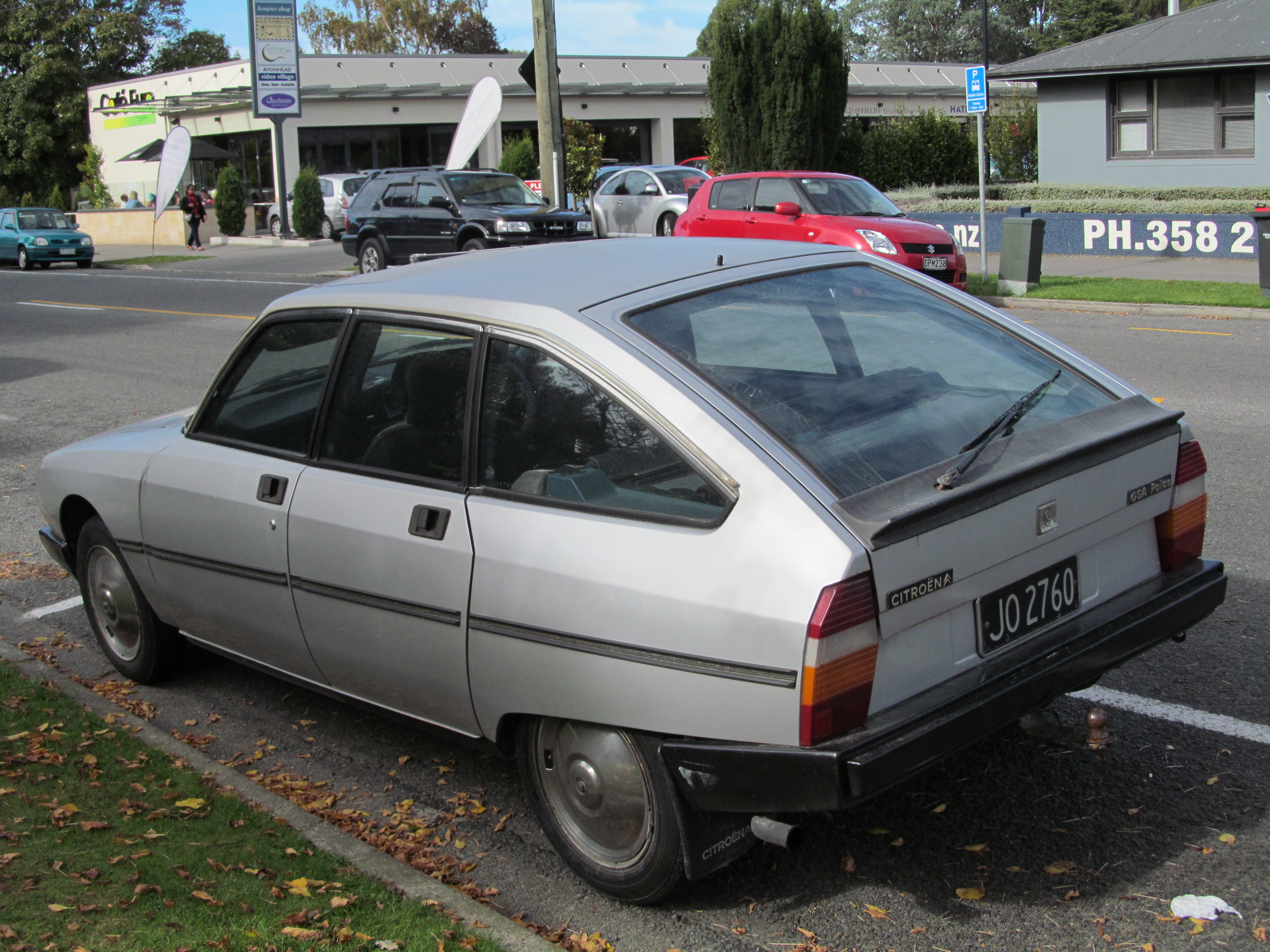
1980 Citroën GSA Pallas rear

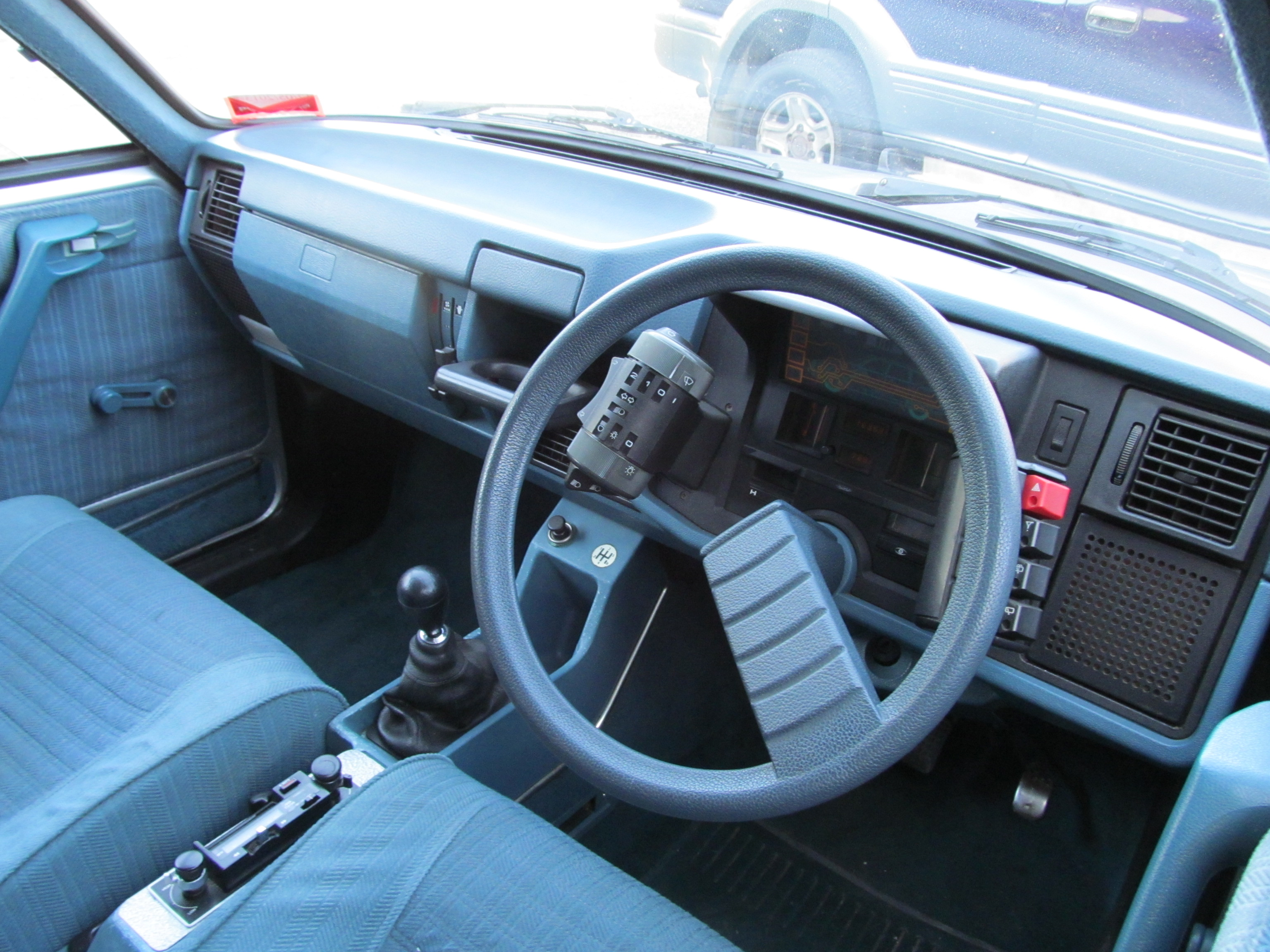
1980 GSA interior

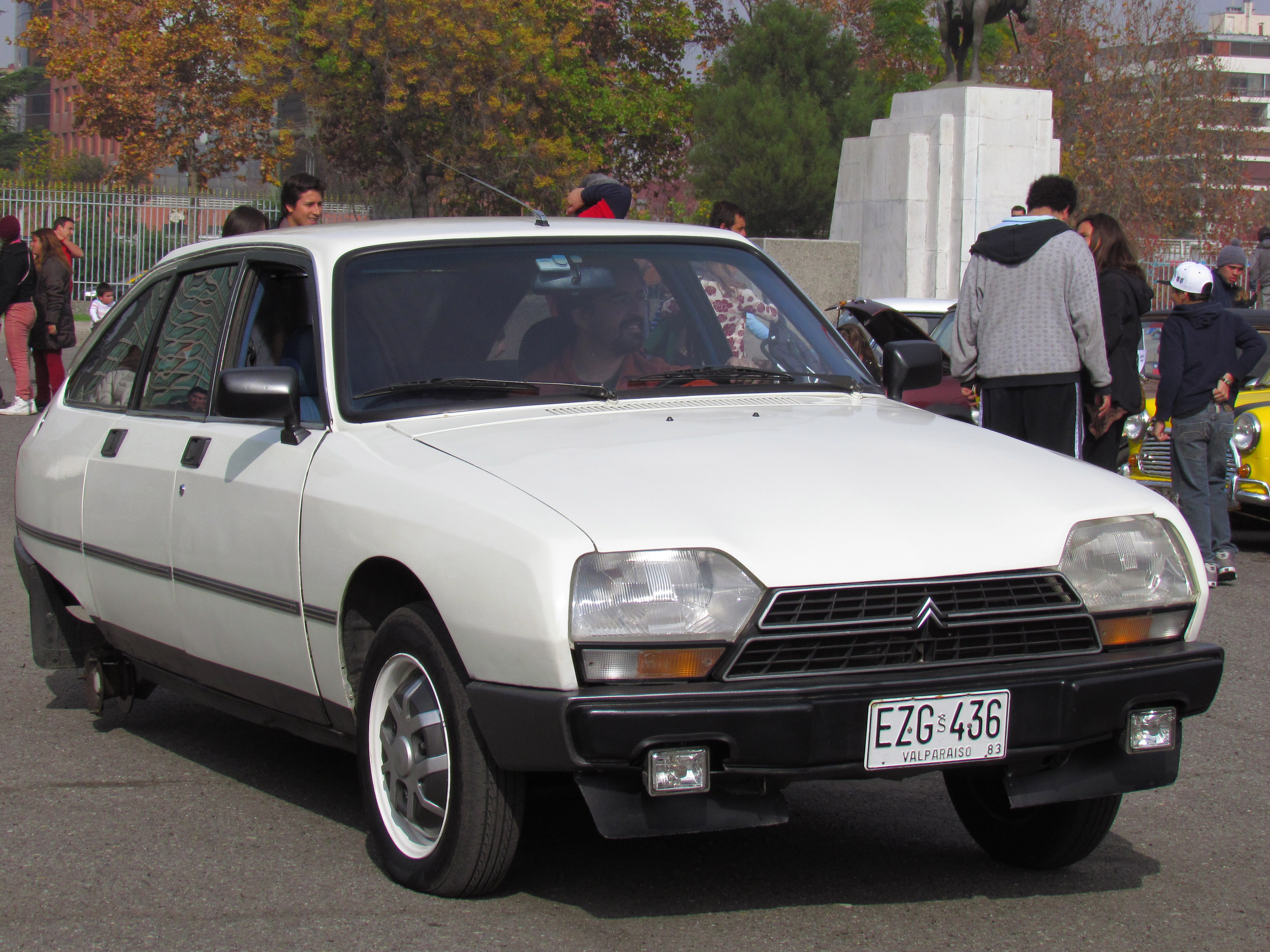
1983 Citroën GSA X3 driving on 3 wheels (see hydropneumatic suspension)

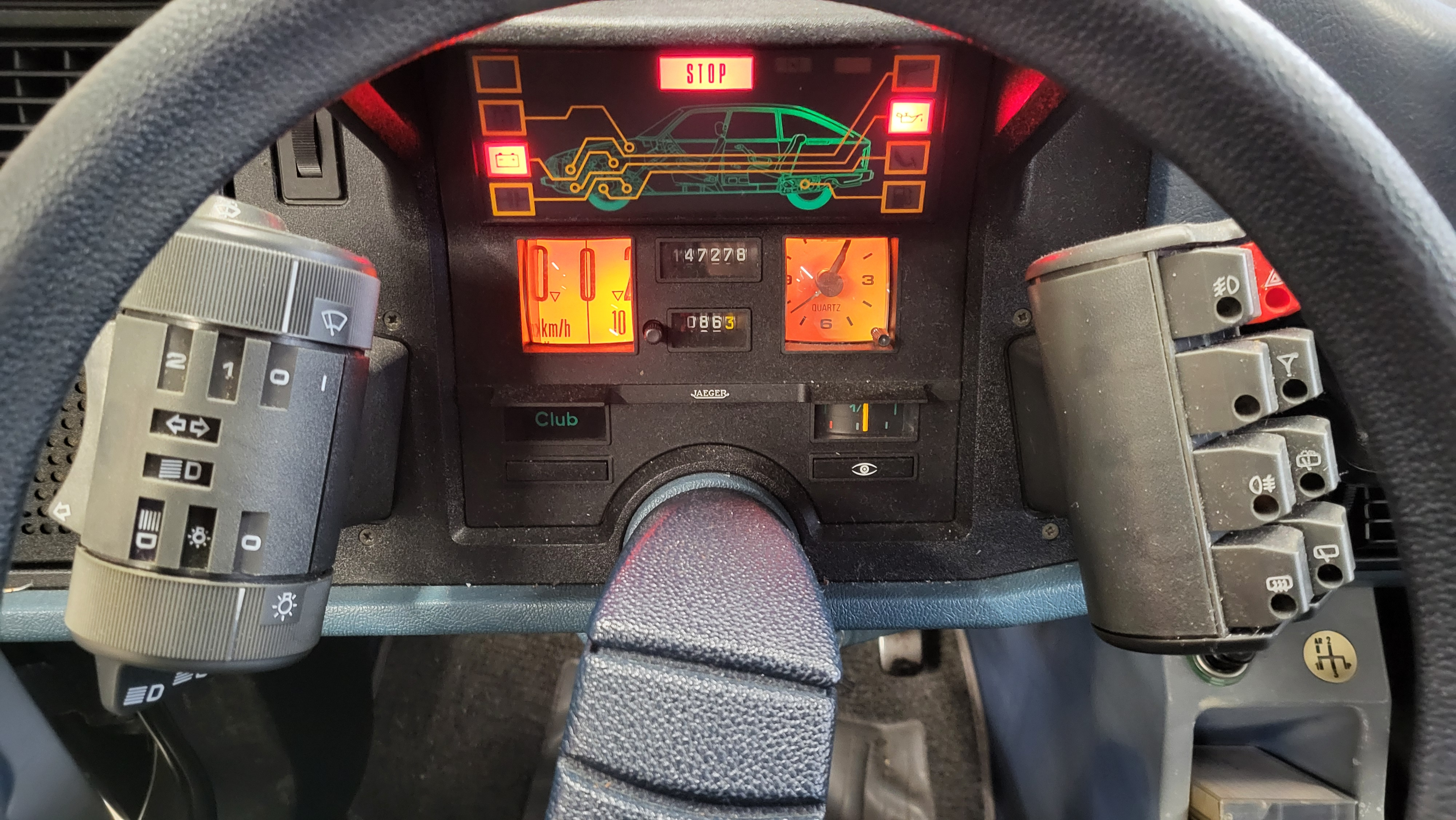
1981 Citroën GSA magnifying speedometer, digital-looking displays and pictograms, and the control satellites

== Mechanics ==
The vehicle had a front-wheel drive layout and was powered by an air-cooled flat-four engine. A series of small engines were available, displacing 1,015, 1,129, 1,222 and 1,299 cc. Power ranged from 40 kW (54 hp) to 49 kW (66 hp). Mated to a four speed gearbox, these were able to pull this car up to steady 151 km/h (94 mph) at 6,250 rpm (with a 1,222 cc engine), due to the very aerodynamic body shape. Citroën's 3-speed C-Matic semi-automatic transmission was available as an alternative to the manual gearbox. With the introduction of the GSA a 5-speed gearbox was offered, which made cruising at high speeds more comfortable and economical (the top speed was raised to 164 km/h (102 mph) for both long and short gearbox ratios). The GS and GSA needed full use of the free-revving engines to maintain progress, except when cruising, in the tradition of the Citroën 2CV.

The four-wheel independent suspension featured a double wishbone layout at the front and trailing arms at the rear. Both axles comprised rigid sub frames that gave the car unmatched ride quality and road holding for the time, even on its narrow tires (factory-mounted Michelin ZX 145SR15).

Its central hydraulic system, powering the four disc brakes (inboard in front to help lower unsprung weight) and the advanced hydro-pneumatic self-levelling suspension, was derived from the Citroën DS. It also has a feature that increased or decreased braking pressure in accordance with cargo load, without any noticeable difference in the brake pedal response. The powered system was different from the typical assisted systems in that there was virtually no travel on the brake pedal even when braking hard. The hydraulic suspension allowed the car to be raised for rough terrain at low speeds (a feature taking account of the country lanes of its native France) and to full height for easy access to the partially enclosed rear wheels. The hand brake lever is mounted on the dashboard as opposed to being mounted between the front seats. In-car entertainment can be fitted in the space that would have been utilised by the handbrake. As with other Citroën cars, the hydraulic system depressurizes over several hours, so the car will gradually sink to the bump stops when the engine is off.

The GS' 1.3-litre engine was also used in the French BFG 1301 "Odyssée" motorcycle. The engines were equipped with a single Solex carburetor and have a bespoke five-speed gearbox with shaft drive. About 650 of these were built between 1981 and 1988, most of them for French police authorities.

== GS Birotor (1973–1975) ==
A two rotor GS was launched in 1973. Dubbed the Citroën GS Birotor (also called Citroën GZ), it featured a much more powerful 79 kW (106 hp) Wankel birotor produced by the joint NSU-Citroën Comotor project. This type of motor is noted for its smooth power delivery which complemented the luxurious ride quality of the hydropneumatic suspension. The engine was also small in displacement relative to its power, an advantage for Tax horsepower calculations, which drive automobile design in France.

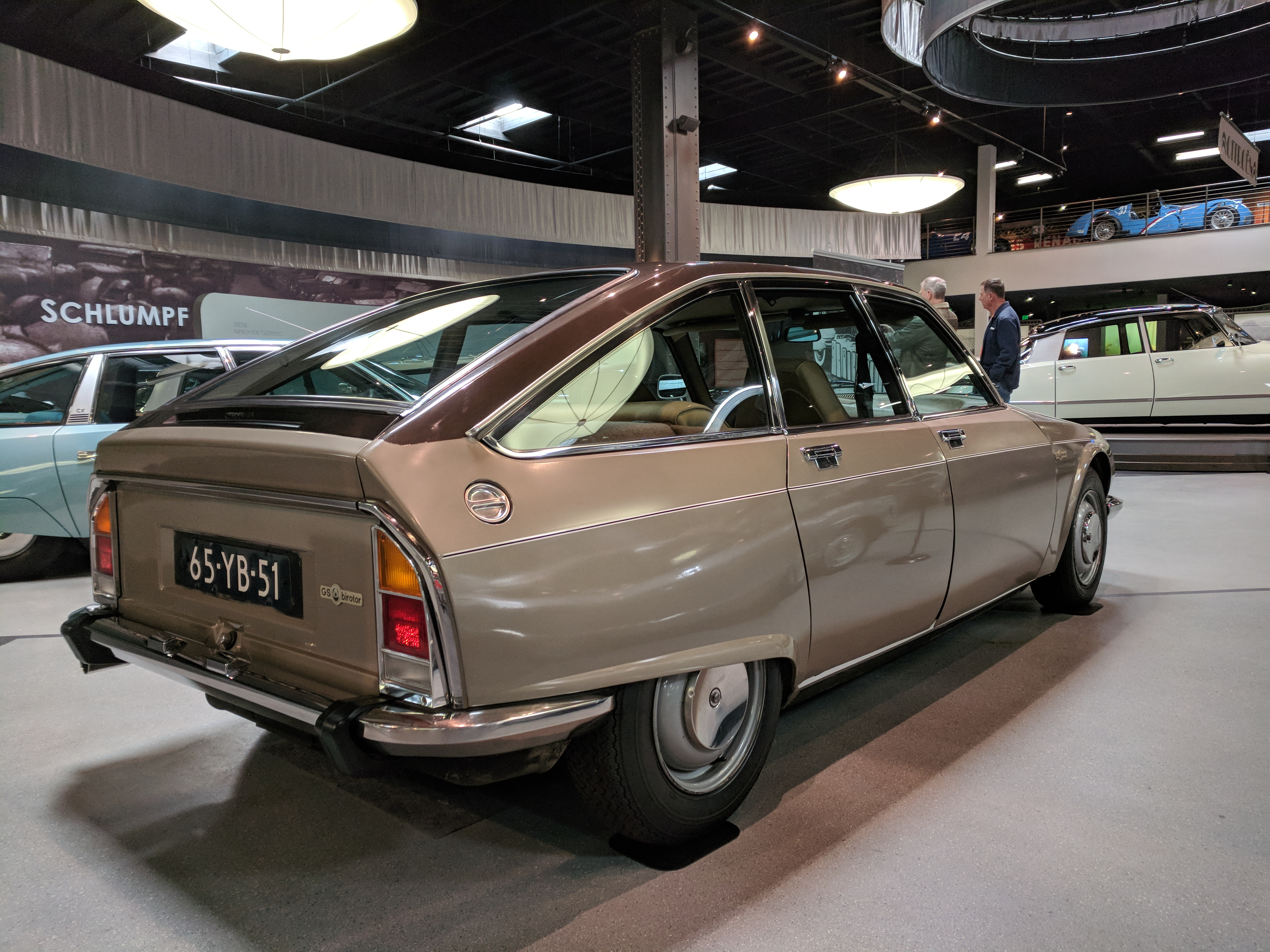
1973 Citroën GS Birotor at Mullin Automotive Museum

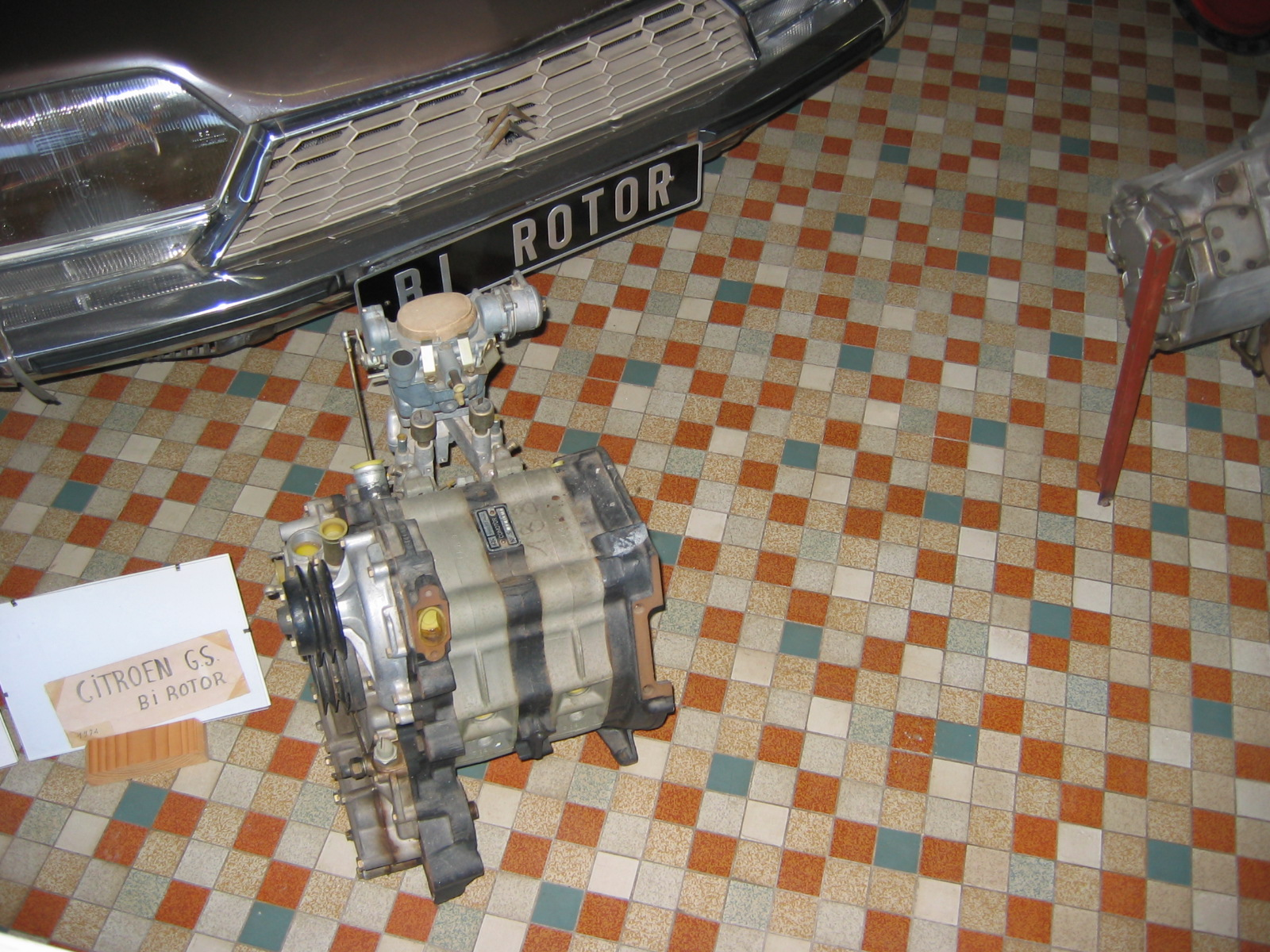
Citroën GS Birotor engine

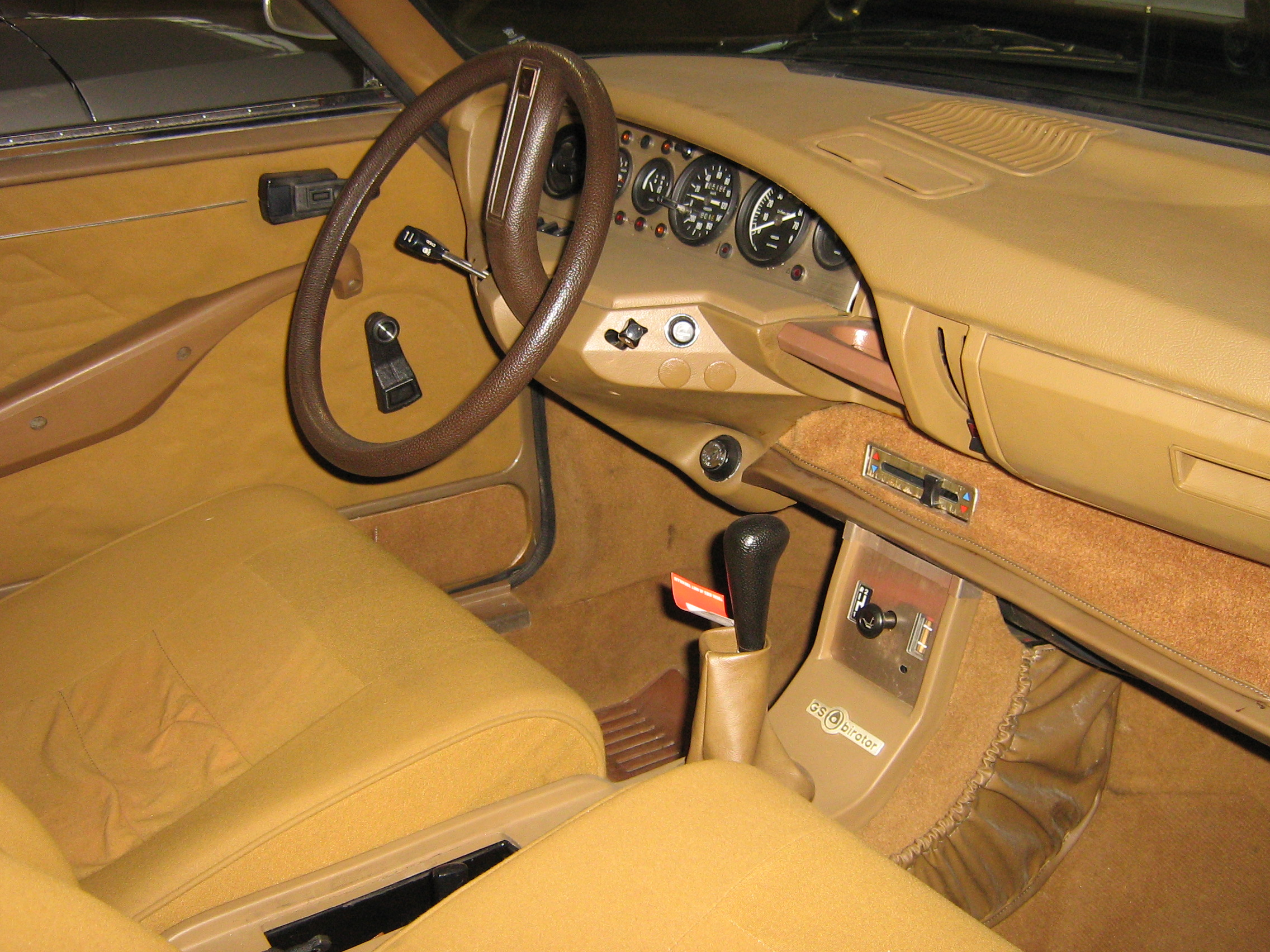
1975 GS Birotor interior

The Birotor was extensively re engineered for the Comotor 624 engine. It still featured disc brakes all around (ventilated in front), but had the front brakes mounted outboard rather than inboard like on the standard GS. In addition, different wheels with a five-bolt pattern rather than three, and a three-speed semi-automatic transmission were combined with a more luxurious interior and flared fenders to set the Birotor apart from its lesser siblings.

The Birotor cost as much as the larger Citroën DS, and 70 percent more than the standard GS. The fuel economy was worse than the largest DS – the DS23EFI. Since it was not economical for its size, and was launched in October 1973, the exact start of the 1973 oil crisis, the Birotor version achieved poor sales and was quickly pulled from the market, after 847 units were sold.

In 1975, Peugeot S.A, which had been a competitor until then, took over Citroën S.A. as its subsidiary. PSA attempted to buy back and scrap each Birotor, as it did not want to support the model with spare parts. A number of Birotors have nonetheless survived in the hands of collectors, many without titles for some time as PSA did not want to recognize the cars.

== GS production abroad ==
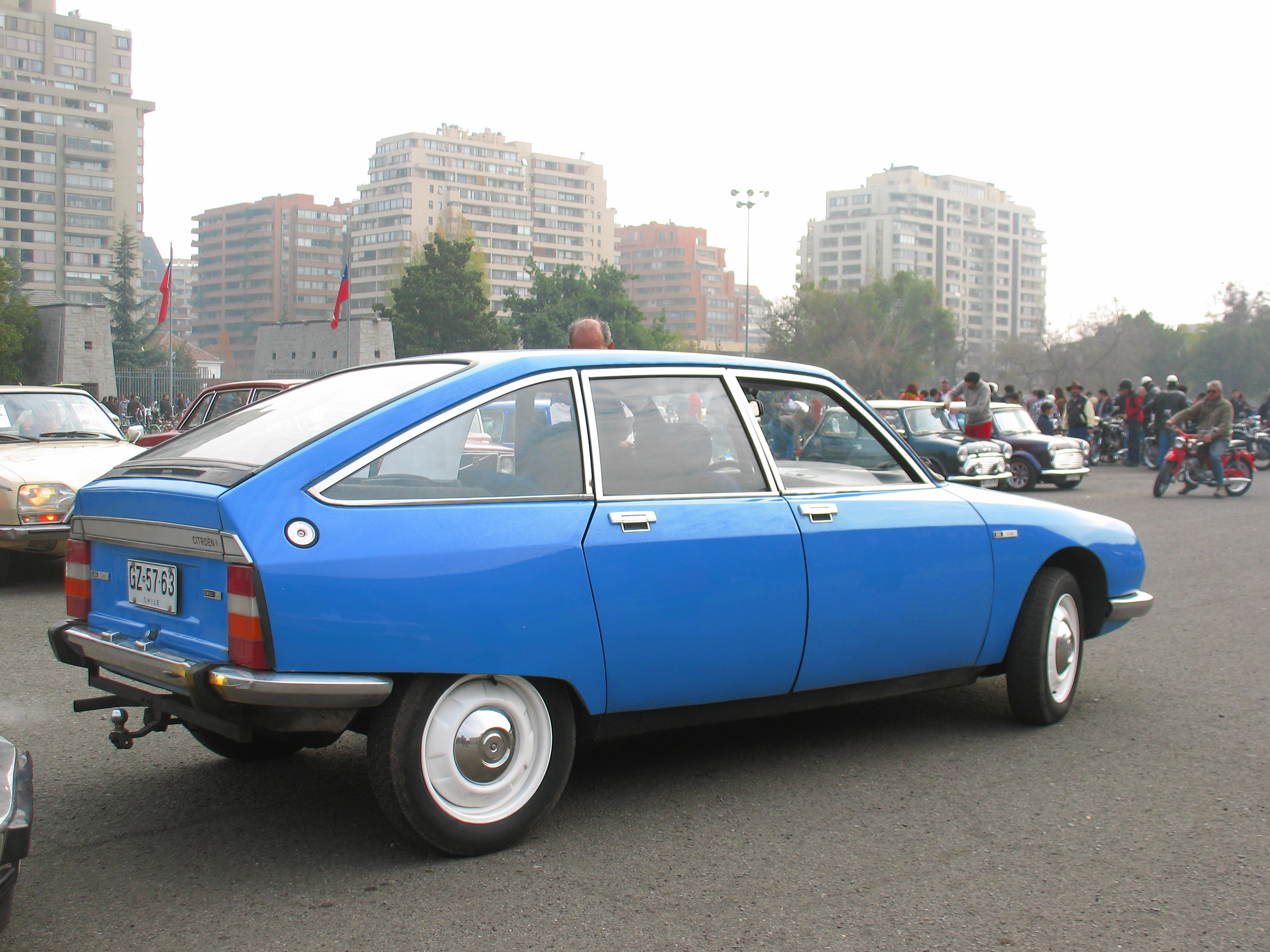
1978 GS 1220 Club in Chile

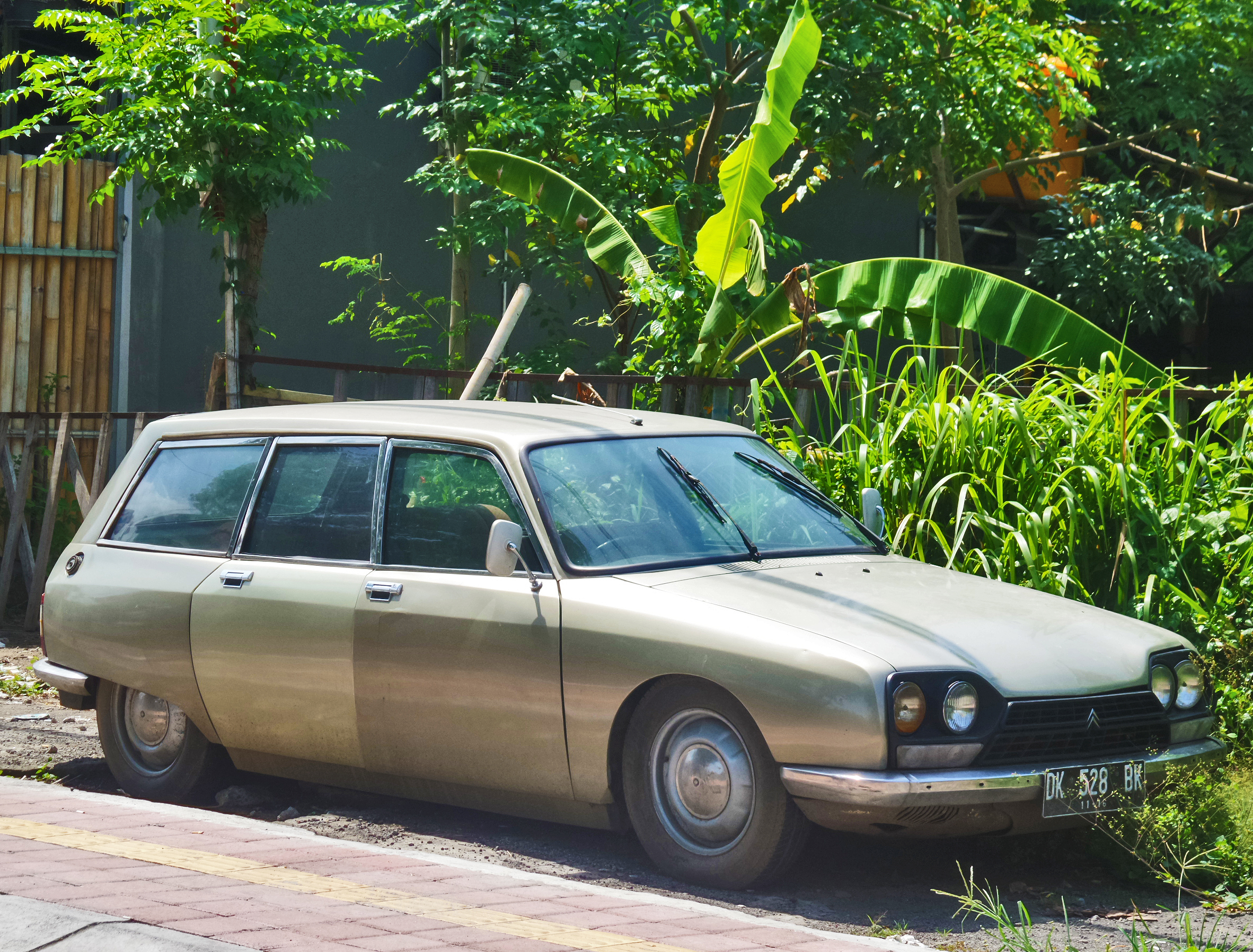
Rare Indonesian-built GSA Break with round headlamps

The GS and GSA were built in a number of countries besides France. 385,000 units were built in Vigo, Spain Besides Portugal, production or assembly took place in countries as varied as South Africa, Chile, and Rhodesia (now Zimbabwe). The South African model was also available as the "GS-X2 Le Mans" special edition, only available in silver, red, or black with an all-white interior. This model received the uprated 1,222 cc engine producing 48 kW (65 PS) achieved by using high compression pistons, round, rather than oval inlet manifolds, a Weber carburetor, and larger diameter driveshafts. A variant of the X2 marketed in Europe, it featured special wheel trim, twin stripes along the sides incorporating an X2 emblem on the front fenders, a rear spoiler, a rear window louvre, and four round headlights mounted in black plastic housings.

All three body-styles, GS and GSA versions and a mix thereof were built in Cakung in East Jakarta, Indonesia by PT Alun Indah. Indonesian production continued until at least 1990. Many Indonesian cars were fitted with the twin-headlight assembly typically seen on Grande Exportation (GE) cars. These modified and reinforced models were fitted with various improvements to deal with warm climates, dust, unpaved roads, and other conditions which would be encountered in French overseas departments and other markets in the developing world.

Renowned moped manufacturer Tomos in Yugoslavia (now Slovenia) also assembled the GS saloon at their plant in Koper. In 1973 a new company, Cimos, was formed by Citroën, Iskra, and Tomos and they took over production. Like the Indonesian models, Cimos sometimes used the twin-headlight fixtures developed for export markets on their GSs (although never on the well-equipped Pallas model). Slovenian GSs were commonly finished in "campus beige" color. The GSA was called the GA in Yugoslavia.

== GSA in East Germany ==
Between 1979 and 1983, around 5,500 were exported to East Germany making it one of the few western cars in the country. Erich Honecker, the East German party leader, also maintained a fleet of the larger CX model (as well as several Volvos).

== Documentary ==
- Production of the GS is described in the Louis Malle documentary film, Humain, trop humain.

== See also ==
- PSA Rennes Plant, concerning the plant in the south-west of Rennes where the GS was built.
- Citroën GS Camargue two-door concept car from Bertone
