= 1972 Cannes Film Festival =

- Official poster of the 25th Cannes Film Festival.
- Opening film: L'aventure c'est l'aventure
- Closing film: Frenzy
- Location: Cannes, France
- Founded: 1946
- Awards: Grand Prix: The Mattei Affair; The Working Class; Goes to Heaven
- No. of films: 25 (In Competition)
- Festival date: 4 May 1972 – 19 May 1972
- Website: festival-cannes.com/en

Cannes Film Festival
- 1973 1971

The 25th annual Cannes Film Festival took place from 4 to 19 May 1972. American filmmaker Joseph Losey served as jury president for the main competition.

The Grand Prix du Festival International du Film, then the festival's main prize, was unanimously jointly awarded to Italian drama films The Working Class Goes to Heaven by Elio Petri and The Mattei Affair by Francesco Rosi.

The festival opened with L'aventure, c'est l'aventure by Claude Lelouch, and closed with Frenzy by Alfred Hitchcock.

== Juries ==
=== Main Competition ===
- Joseph Losey, American filmmaker - Jury President
- Bibi Andersson, Swedish actress
- Georges Auric, French composer
- Erskine Caldwell, American writer
- Mark Donskoy, Soviet filmmaker
- Miloš Forman, Czechoslovak filmmaker
- Giorgio Papi, Italian producer
- Jean Rochereau, French journalist
- Alain Tanner, Swiss filmmaker
- Naoki Togawa, Japanese

=== Short Films Competition ===
- Frédéric Rossif, French filmmaker - Jury President
- Istvan Dosai, Hungarian cinematographer
- Vicente Pineda, Italian journalist

== Official Selection ==
=== In Competition ===
The following feature films competed for the Grand Prix du Festival International du Film:

English title	Original title	Director(s)	Production country
Dear Louise	Chère Louise	Philippe de Broca	France
A Fan's Notes		Eric Till	Canada
Havoc	Das Unheil	Peter Fleischmann	West Germany
Hearth Fires	Les Feux de la Chandeleur	Serge Korber	France, Italy
I Love You Rosa	אני אוהב אותך רוזה	Moshé Mizrahi	Israel
Images		Robert Altman	United Kingdom, United States
Jeremiah Johnson		Sydney Pollack	United States
King, Queen, Knave		Jerzy Skolimowski	West Germany, United States
Malpertuis		Harry Kümel	Belgium, France, West Germany
The Mattei Affair	Il Caso Mattei	Francesco Rosi	Italy
Oil Lamps	Petrolejové lampy	Juraj Herz	Czechoslovakia
Pearl in the Crown	Perła w koronie	Kazimierz Kutz	Poland
Red Psalm	Még kér a nép	Miklós Jancsó	Hungary
The Ruling Class		Peter Medak	United Kingdom
The Seduction of Mimi	Mimí metallurgico ferito nell'onore	Lina Wertmüller	Italy
Silence	沈黙	Masahiro Shinoda	Japan
Slaughterhouse-Five		George Roy Hill	United States
Solaris	Солярис	Andrei Tarkovsky	Soviet Union
The Surveyors	Les arpenteurs	Michel Soutter	Switzerland
To Find a Man		Buzz Kulik	United States
Trotta		Johannes Schaaf	West Germany
The True Nature of Bernadette	La vraie nature de Bernadette	Gilles Carle	Canada
The Visitors		Elia Kazan	United States
We Won't Grow Old Together	Nous ne vieillirons pas ensemble	Maurice Pialat	France
The Working Class Goes to Heaven	La classe operaia va in paradiso	Elio Petri	Italy

=== Out of Competition ===
The following films were selected to be screened out of competition:

- Asta Nielsen by Asta Nielsen
- Bröder Carl by Susan Sontag
- Faustine et le bel été by Nina Companéez
- Frenzy by Alfred Hitchcock
- L'aventure c'est l'aventure by Claude Lelouch
- La dérive by Paula Delsol
- La Génération du désert by Nicole Stéphane
- Une guerre pour une paix by Nicole Stéphane
- Lisa and the Devil by Mario Bava
- Den gale dansker by Kirsten Stenbæk
- Le lys de mer by Jacqueline Audry
- Hvezda Betlémská by Hermína Týrlová
- Alye maki Issyk-Kulya by Bolotbek Shamshiyev
- Les Jeunes Filles En Fleurs by David Hamilton, Philippe Leroi
- Macbeth by Roman Polanski
- Marie by Márta Mészáros
- Merry-Go-Round by Kirsten Stenbæk
- Papa, les petits bateaux by Nelly Kaplan
- Roma by Federico Fellini
- Serata by Malvina Ursianu
- Sziget a szárazföldön by Judit Elek

=== Short Films Competition ===
The following short films competed for the Short Film Palme d'Or:

- Atlantyda by Piotr Szpakowicz
- The Birth of Aphrodite by Leland Auslender
- Le Fusil à lunette by Jean Chapot
- Giovanni Michelucci by Fernando Cerchio
- Hundertwasser's Rainy Day by Peter Schamoni
- Jour de classe by Henri Jouf
- Magic Graz by Curt Faudon
- Malka dnevna muzika by Ivan Vesselinov
- Mini by Stoian Doukov
- I Omorfia tou thanatou by Nestoras Matsas
- Operation X-70 by Raoul Servais
- Pour solde de tout compte by Louis Pitzele
- Een Zeer zonnige wereld by Pieter De Groot
- Zikkaron by Laurent Coderre

== Parallel sections ==
=== International Critics' Week ===
The following feature films were screened for the 11th International Critics' Week (11e Semaine de la Critique):

- Avoir 20 ans dans les Aurès by René Vautier (France)
- Fritz the Cat by Ralph Bakshi (United States)
- The Hamburg Uprising of 1923 (Der Hamburger Aufstand Oktober 1923) by Reiner Etz, Gisela Tuchtenhagen, Klaus Wildenhahn (West Germany)
- Dirty Money (La Maudite Galette) by Denys Arcand (Canada)
- Pilgrimage by Beni Montreso (United States)
- The Trial of Catonsville Nine by Gorgon Davidson (United States)
- Winter Soldier (Anonymous) (United States)
- Prata Palomares by André Faria (Brazil) (screening was canceled at the request of the Brazilian government)

=== Directors' Fortnight ===
The following films were screened for the 1972 Directors' Fortnight (Quinzaine des Réalizateurs):

- Alianza para el progreso by Julio César Ludueña (Argentina)
- All the Advantages by Christopher Mason (United Kingdom)
- The Birch Wood (Brzezina) by Andrzej Wajda (Poland)
- Confessions Among Actresses (Kokuhakuteki joyûron) by Yoshishige Yoshida (Japan)
- The Days of Water (Los días del agua) by Manuel Octavio Gómez (Cuba)
- Diary of a Suicide (Le journal d'un suicidé) by Stanislav Stanojevic (France)
- Los dias del amor by Alberto Isaac (Mexico)
- The Dupes (Al-makhdu'un) by Tewfik Saleh (Syria)
- Emitai by Ousmane Sembene (Senegal)
- Faire la déménageuse by José Varela (France)
- Family Life by Ken Loach (United Kingdom)
- Film Portrait [doc.) by Jerome Hill (United States)
- Il gesto by Marcello Grottesi (Italy)
- Hail by Fred Levinson (United States)
- Heat by Paul Morrissey (United States)
- Homolka a tobolka by Jaroslav Papoušek (Czechoslovakia)
- Land of Silence and Darkness (Land des Schweigens und der Dunkelheit) (doc.) by Werner Herzog (West Germany)
- Luminous Procuress by Steven Arnold (United States)
- Marjoe by Howard Smith, Sarah Kernochan (United States)
- The People by John Korty (United States)
- Postchi by Dariush Mehrjui (Iran)
- ¡Qué hacer! by Saul Landau, Raoul Ruiz, James Becket, Bill Yarhaus, Nina Serrano (Chile, United States)
- Reed: Insurgent Mexico (Reed, México insurgente) by Paul Leduc (Mexico)
- Le Sang by Jean-Daniel Pollet (France)
- São Bernardo by Leon Hirszman (Brazil)
- Savages by James Ivory (United Kingdom)
- Shura by Toshio Matsumoto (Japan)
- St. Michael Had a Rooster (San Michele aveva un gallo) by Paolo and Vittorio Taviani (Italy)
- Summer Soldiers by Hiroshi Teshigahara (Japan)
- La tecnica e il rito by Miklós Jancsó (Italy)
- Der Tod der Maria Malibran by Werner Schroeter (West Germany)
- Week-end à Sochaux by Groupe Medvedkine (France)
- Wezwanie by Wojciech Solarz (Poland)
- The Wise Guys (Les smattes) by Jean-Claude Labrecque (Canada)
- Die Zelle by Horst Bienek (West Germany)

Short films

- Autoportrait d'un pornographe by Robert Swaim (France)
- Camille ou la comédie catastrophique by Claude Miller (France)
- Celui qui venait d'ailleurs by Atahualpa Lichy, J.P. Torok (France)
- Das Kaputte Kino by H.H.K. Schoenherr (Switzerland)
- Death of a Sandwichman by G. Henderickx, Robbe De Hert (Belgium)
- Drug Abuse by Pat Lehman (United States)
- Empereur Tomato-Ketchup by Shuji Terayama (Japan)
- Homo Augens by Ante Zaninovic (Yougoslavie)
- Kamasutra Rides Again by Bob Godfrey (United Kingdom)
- La Chute by Paul Dopff (France)
- Le Cabot by P. Letellier J. (France)
- Le Sourire by Paul Dopff (France)
- Légendes et chateaux by Patrick Hella (Belgium)
- Luger by Georges Bensoussan (France)
- Saint-Denis sur Avenir by Sarah Maldoror (France)
- Yunbogi no nikki by Nagisa Oshima (Japan)

== Official Awards ==
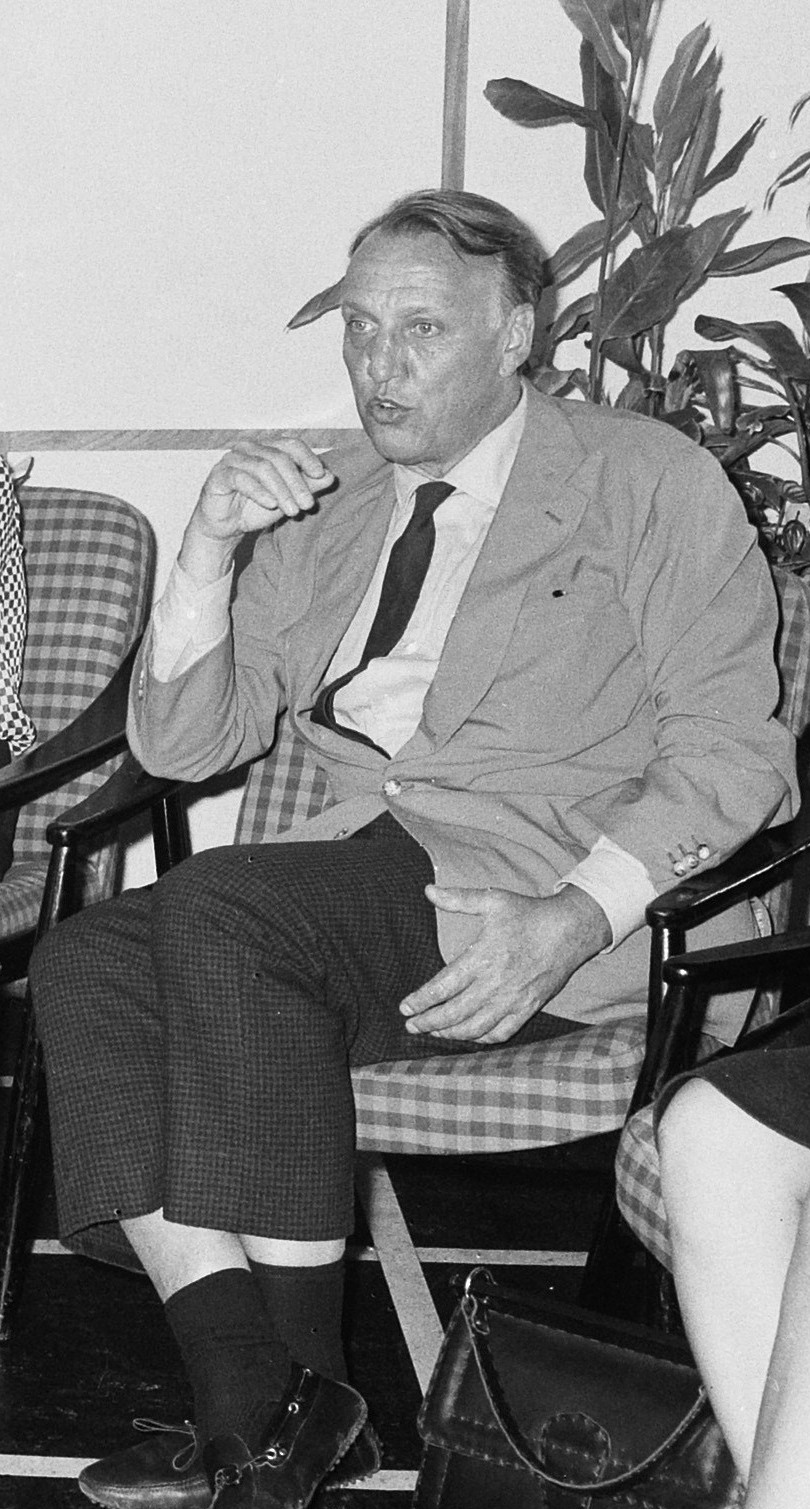
Joseph Losey, Jury President

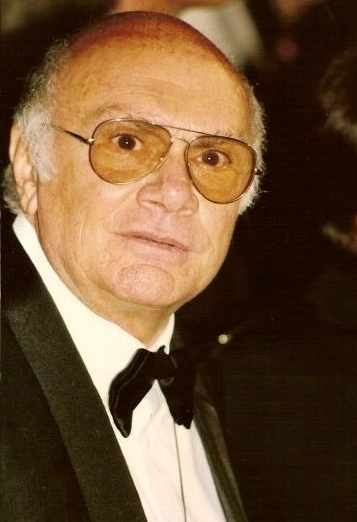
Francesco Rosi, Grand Prix winner

=== In Competition ===
- Grand Prix du Festival International du Film:
  - The Working Class Goes to Heaven by Elio Petri
  - The Mattei Affair by Francesco Rosi
- Grand Prix Spécial du Jury: Solaris by Andrei Tarkovsky
- Best Director: Miklós Jancsó for Red Psalm
- Best Actress: Susannah York for Images
- Best Actor: Jean Yanne for We Won't Grow Old Together
- Jury Prize: Slaughterhouse-Five by George Roy Hill
- Special Mention: Gian Maria Volonté for The Working Class Goes to Heaven and The Mattei Affair

=== Short Films Competition ===
- Grand Prix International du Festival: Le Fusil à lunette by Jean Chapot
- Prix spécial du Jury: Operation X-70 by Raoul Servais

== Independent Awards ==
=== FIPRESCI Prize ===
- Avoir 20 ans dans les Aurès by René Vautier

=== Commission Supérieure Technique ===
- Technical Grand Prize: Zikkaron by Laurent Coderre

== Media ==
- INA: Atmosphere at the 1972 Festival (commentary in French)
- INA: Groucho Marx and Alfred Hitchcock at Cannes (interview in French and English)
- INA: Présentation du film "Malpertuis" (commentary in French)
- INA: The winners (commentary in French)
