= Étienne Becker =

French cinematographer (1936–1995)

- Born: 1 May 1936; Paris, France
- Died: 11 December 1995 (aged 59); Paris, France
- Occupation: Director of Photography
- Years active: 1963–1995
- Father: Jacques Becker
- Relatives: Jean Becker (brother)

Étienne Becker (1 May 1936, Paris, France – 11 December 1995, Paris) was a French Director of Photography.

== Life ==
He is the son of the French director Jacques Becker, and the brother of Jean Becker.

== Filmography ==
Year	Title	Director	Notes
1963	Le Joli Mai	Chris Marker; Pierre Lhomme	Documentary
1964	Cassius le grand	William Klein	Documentary
1964	In vino veritas	Mario Ruspoli	
1965	Six in Paris	Éric Rohmer; Jean Rouch	2 segments
1965	Les saintes chéries	Jean Becker	TV series (1 episode)
1966	Joë Caligula - Du suif chez les dabes	José Bénazéraf	
1966	Rotterdam-Europoort	Joris Ivens	Documentary
1966	Chappaqua	Conrad Rooks	
1966	Voilà l'ordre	Jacques Baratier	Short
1967	Le désordre à vingt ans	Jacques Baratier (2)	Documentary
1968	L'étrangère	Sergio Gobbi	
1968	One More Time	Daniel Pommereulle	Short
1969	L'amour fou	Jacques Rivette	
1969	Calcutta	Louis Malle	Documentary
1969	Phantom India	Louis Malle (2)	TV mini-series Documentary
1969	Muhammad Ali, the Greatest	William Klein (2)	Documentary
1969	Three	James Salter	
1970	OSS 117 Takes a Vacation	Pierre Kalfon	
1970	Last Known Address	José Giovanni	
1970	La maison	Gérard Brach	
1971	The Boat on the Grass	Gérard Brach (2)	
1971	La fin du jeu	Renaud Walter	Short
1971	L'homme au cerveau greffé	Jacques Doniol-Valcroze	
1973	Aimez-vous les uns les autres... mais pas trop	Daniel Moosmann	
1974	Don't Touch the White Woman!	Marco Ferreri	
1974	La gueule de l'emploi	Jacques Rouland	
1974	Humain, trop humain	Louis Malle (3); René Vautier	Documentary
1974	Place de la République	Louis Malle (4)	Documentary
1974	The Secret	Robert Enrico	
1975	Le bougnoul	Daniel Moosmann (2)	
1975	Le vieux fusil	Robert Enrico (2)	Nominated - César Award for Best Cinematography
1976	Police Python 357	Alain Corneau	
1976	La spirale	Armand Mattelart; Valérie Mayoux; Jacqueline Meppiel	Documentary
1976	The Toy	Francis Veber	Nominated - César Award for Best Cinematography
1978	On peut le dire sans se fâcher	Roger Coggio	
1978	Utopia	Iradj Azimi	
1978	Vas-y maman	Nicole de Buron	
1979	The Dogs	Alain Jessua	
1980	C'est encore loin l'Amérique?	Roger Coggio (2)	
1980	Je vous aime	Claude Berri	
1981	Strange Affair	Pierre Granier-Deferre	
1981	Le rat	Elisabeth Huppert	Short
1982	Que les gros salaires lèvent le doigt!	Denys Granier-Deferre	
1983	One Deadly Summer	Jean Becker (2)	
1983	L'ami de Vincent	Pierre Granier-Deferre (2)	
1984	Les fausses confidences	Daniel Moosmann (3)	
1991	Mississippi One	Sarah Moon	
1995	Élisa	Jean Becker (3)	
