= Phantom India =

- L'Inde fantôme: Reflexions sur un voyage
- Genre: Documentary
- Directed by: Louis Malle
- Narrated by: Louis Malle
- Countries of origin: France; India
- No. of episodes: 7

Production
- Producer: Louis Kastner
- Cinematography: Étienne Becker
- Editor: Suzanne Baron
- Running time: 363

L'Inde fantôme: Reflexions sur un voyage is a 1969 French seven part television documentary miniseries about India, directed by Louis Malle. It was shown on BBC television as Louis Malle's India.

Malle later said that the film was his most personal work and the one he was most proud of. It is widely regarded as the crowning achievement of his career. It was initially inspired by a two-month trip to India in late 1967 that Malle made on behalf of the French Ministry of Foreign Affairs to present a selection of "new French cinema" throughout the country. Filming took place between January 5, 1968, and May 1, 1968, with a crew of two, a cameraman and a sound recordist. Malle arrived in India with no particular plans and financed the trip himself. The resulting 30 hours of footage was then edited down to the 363 minutes of Phantom India. The 105-minute-long Calcutta used the footage he had recorded over his three-week stay in that city. Phantom India was shown on French television and the BBC in the UK in 1969.

Many British Indians and the Indian Government felt that Malle had shown a one-sided portrait of India, focusing on the impoverished, rather than the developing parts of the country. A diplomatic incident occurred when the Indian government asked the BBC to stop broadcasting the programme. The BBC refused and were briefly asked to leave their New Delhi bureau.

== Episodes ==
No.	Title	Original release date
1	"The Impossible Camera"	1969
2	"Things Seen in Madras"	1969
3	"The Indians and the Sacred"	1969
4	"Dreams and Reality"	1969
5	"A Look at the Castes"	1969
6	"On the Fringes of Indian Society"	1969
7	"Bombay: The Future India"	1969
