= René Vautier =

French film director

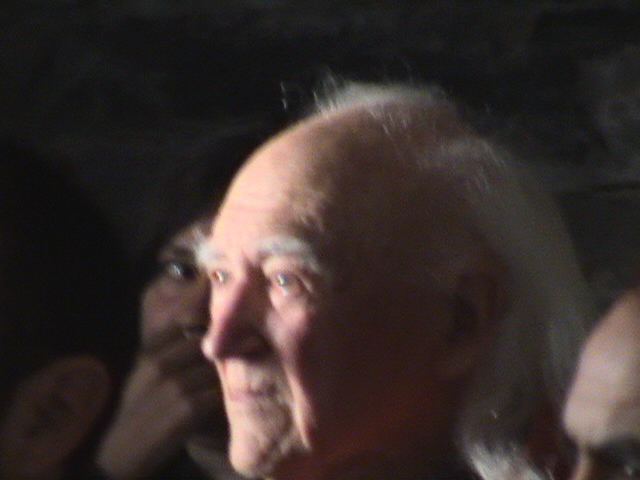
- René Vautier (2005)
- Born: 15 January 1928; Camaret-sur-Mer, France
- Died: 4 January 2015 (aged 86); Cancale, France
- Occupation: Film director
- Known for: Afrique 50

René Vautier (French: [ʁəne votje]; 15 January 1928 – 4 January 2015) was a French film director. His films, which were often controversial with French authorities, addressed many issues, such as the Algerian War, French colonialism in Africa, pollution, racism, women's rights, and apartheid in South Africa. Many were banned or condemned, and one caused him to go to prison for a year.

== Early life ==
He was born on 15 January 1928 in Camaret-sur-Mer, Finistère, France, the son of a factory worker and a teacher. He joined the French Resistance during World War II at the age of 15 and later received the Croix de guerre and the Order of the Nation from Charles de Gaulle for his militant activity. He then joined the French Communist Party and studied film-making at the Institut des hautes études cinématographiques, where he graduated in 1948.

== Career ==
=== Afrique 50 ===
Vautier made his first film, Afrique 50, in 1950, when he was 21. He was assigned to visit French West Africa and make an educational film, but he was appalled by the conditions he witnessed, including lack of doctors and crimes committed by the French Army. The resulting film was confiscated by police using legislation decreed by Pierre Laval, but Vautier managed to recover enough footage to publish the 17-minute film in 1950. It was hailed as the first anti-colonial French film. He was indicted thirteen times for it and sentenced to a year in prison. The documentary was banned for forty years.

=== Later works ===
He worked with Louis Malle to make Humain, trop humain in 1973, a film about conditions in a Citroën car plant. Vautier directed Peuple en marche, which gives the history of the National Liberation Army and the Algerian War, in 1963. Another Algerian War film, Avoir 20 ans dans les Aurès (1972), won the International Federation of Film Critics Award at the 1972 Cannes Film Festival. He made over 180 films, many of them destroyed by the French government. Several of Vautier's other films were presented at Cannes, including Mourir pour des images, Comment on devient un ennemi de l'intérieur, Les trois cousins, and Vacances tunisiennes. In January 1973, he went on hunger strike to protest film censorship. He received the Order of the Ermine in 2000. On 4 January 2015, he died at a hospital in Cancale, Brittany.

== Filmography ==
Capitalism

- Un Homme est Mort, film about the death of the worker Édouard Mazé, during the manifestations and strikes in Brest (Bretagne, France) during March-April 1950. The title is taken from one of Paul Éluard's poem in Au rendez-vous allemand (1944).
- Anneaux d'or, with Claudia Cardinale in her first act, one of his rare fiction movie, which got the Silver Bear at the festival of West-Berlin in 1956.
- Humain, trop humain (1973) in collaboration with Louis Malle.
- "Classe de lutte" (1969) in collaboration with the workers of Medvedkine Group and Chris Marker.
- "Transmission d'expérience ouvrière" (1973)
- "Quand tu disais Valéry", (1975) the movie follows a long strike of the caravane factory Caravelair at Trignac, best French movie at the festival of Rotterdam.

Colonialism, especially in Algeria

- Une nation, l'Algérie, (1954) one of the copy is destroyed, the second disappeared. After the revolution of 1 November 1954, the movie narrates the true story of Algeria's conquest by France. René Vautier is prosecuted for interfering with the internal security of the state for a sentence in the film: "Algeria will be independent anyway".
- Afrique 50 (1956) René Vautier's first movie released and first French anti-colonilisation movie
- Algérie en flammes (1958)
- Un Peuple en marche (1963) a movie about the transition between the Algerian war of independence and the reconstruction of the country.
- Avoir 20 ans dans les Aurès (1972) with Alexandre Arcady, Yves Branellec, Philippe Léotard. Receive the International Critics Prize at Cannes festival in 1972. http://www.avoir20ansdanslesaures.net/wp/
- Déja le sang de mai ensemençait novembre (1982)
- "Le cinema des premiers pas" made in Algeria in 1985 and about his participation in the cinematographic activity in an independent Algeria.

Racism in France

- Les trois cousins (1970) drama fiction about the living conditions of three Algerian cousins looking for a job in France. Award for the best Human right movie in Strasbourg.
- Les Ajoncs (1971)
- Le Remords (1974)
- Vous avez dit : français ? (1986), Reflection around the notion of French citizenship and French history of immigration.

South-African Apartheid

- Le Glas (1964)
- Frontline (1976) made with Oliver Tambo and co-produced with the African National Congress.

Environment

- Marée noire, colère rouge (1978), best documentary worldwide at 1978 Rotterdam Film Festival.
- Mission pacifique (1988), documentary with witnesses of atomic explosions in the Pacific Ocean and sinking of Greenpeace boat Rainbow Warrior.
- Hirochirac (1995), about the involvement of Jacques Chirac with nuclear tests.

Extreme-Right politics in France

- À propos de… l'autre détail (1984), Documentary about people that have been tortured during the Algerian War of Independence by Jean-Marie Le Pen.
- Châteaubriant, mémoire vivante (1985)

Feminism

- Quand les femmes ont pris la colère (1977), in collaboration with Soazig Chappedelaine.

Bretagne

- Mourir pour des images (1971)
- La Folle de Toujane (1974), fiction, in collaboration with Nicole Le Garrec.
- Le Poisson commande (1976), Oscar of the best movie about the Sea.
- Vacances en Giscardie (1980)
- Histoires d'images, Images d'Histoire (2014), documentary, in collaboration with Moïra Chappedelaine.
