= Citroën GS Camargue =

Concept car designed by Bertone

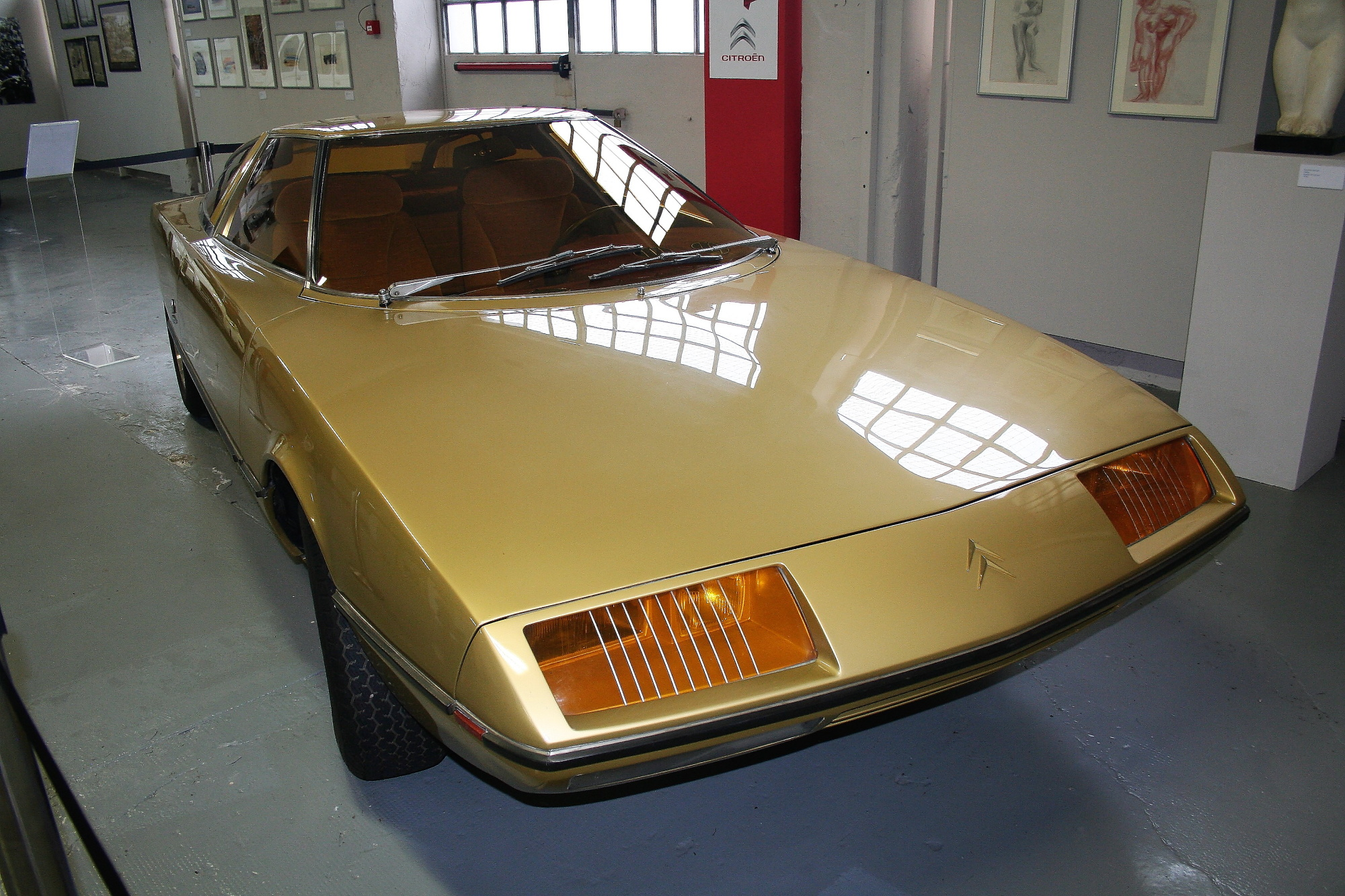

Overview
- Manufacturer: Citroën
- Production: 1972
- Designer: Marc Deschamps and Marcello Gandini at Bertone

Body and chassis
- Body style: 3-door hatchback
- Layout: FF layout
- Related: Citroën GS

Powertrain
- Engine: 1,015 cc Air-cooled H4

The Citroën GS Camargue is a concept car based on the Citroën GS, presented as a three-door hatchback with 2+2 seating. It was designed by the Italian company Bertone and presented in 1972 at the Geneva Motor Show.

The GS Camargue used GS mechanical components, and was the same overall length, but 6 cm (2.4 in) wider and 20 cm (7.9 in) lower. It retained the front wheel drive layout and hydropneumatic suspension from the GS, as well as using many of the interior components from the GS, presumably to make a production version more viable. The exterior of the car features design details such as a wraparound windshield, large curved glass rear hatch, clamshell hood, squared off rear wheel arch, pillarless doors, and flush door handles.

Historically, this was the first collaboration between Bertone and Citroën, which later produced the successful BX and many other subsequent Citroën models.

The GS Camargue is part of Bertone's historical collection and has been showcased at automotive events worldwide, including the Rétromobile salon in Paris in 2019, on the occasion of Citroën's centenary.

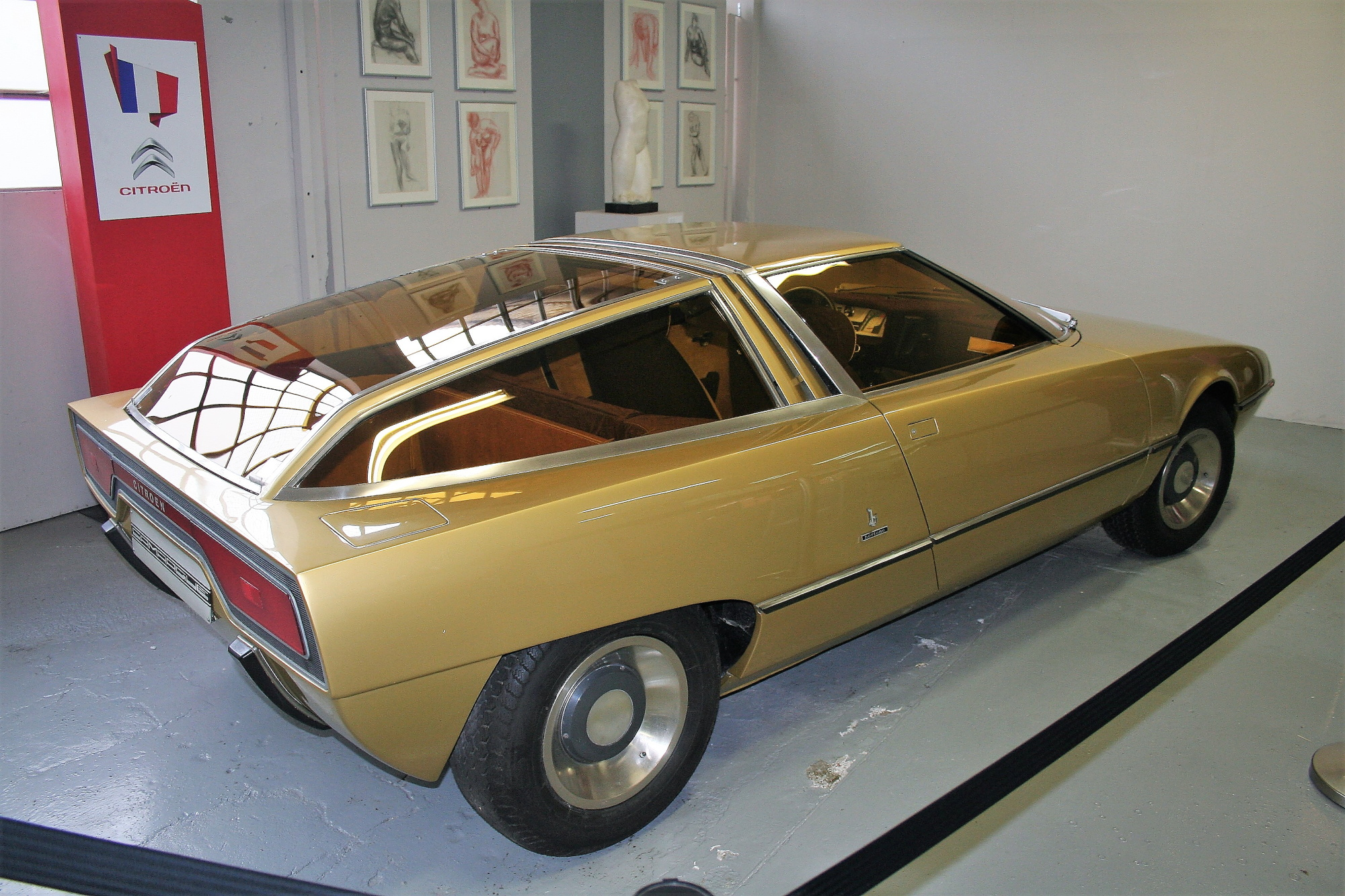
GS Camargue, rear view

== See also ==
- Camargue
