= Thumeries =

- Commune
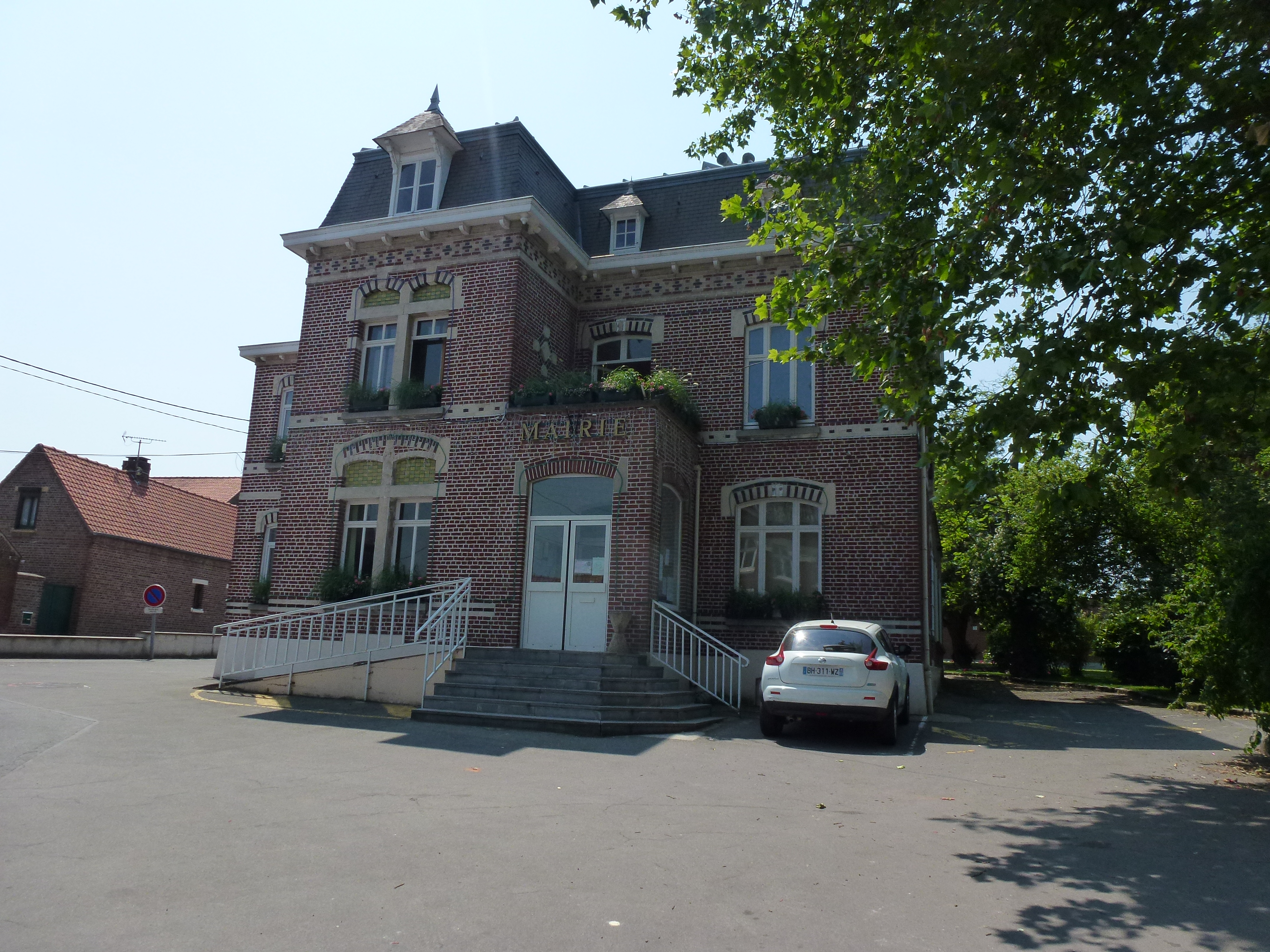
- The town hall in Thumeries

- Coat of arms
- Location of Thumeries
- Location within France Location within Hauts-de-France
- Coordinates: 50°28′36″N 3°03′32″E
- Country: France
- Region: Hauts-de-France
- Department: Nord
- Arrondissement: Lille
- Canton: Templeuve-en-Pévèle
- Intercommunality: CC Pévèle-Carembault

Government
  - Mayor (2020–2026): Nadège Bourghelle-Kos
- Area^{1}: 7.03 km^{2} (2.71 sq mi)
- Elevation: 58 m (190 ft)
- Highest elevation: 68 m (223 ft)
- Lowest elevation: 44 m (144 ft)
- Population (2023): 4,170
  - Density: 593/km^{2} (1,540/sq mi)
- Time zone: UTC+01:00 (CET)
  - Summer (DST): UTC+02:00 (CEST)
- INSEE/Postal code: 59592 /59239
- ^{1} French Land Register data, which excludes lakes, ponds, glaciers > 1 km^{2} (0.386 sq mi or 247 acres) and river estuaries.

Thumeries (French pronunciation: [tymʁi]) is a commune in the Nord department in northern France.

== Population ==
Historical population
Year	Pop.	±% p.a.
1968	3,477	—
1975	3,600	+0.50%
1982	3,422	−0.72%
1990	3,225	−0.74%
1999	3,394	+0.57%
2007	3,810	+1.46%
2012	3,945	+0.70%
2017	3,900	−0.23%
2023	4,170	+1.12%
Source: INSEE

== Heraldry ==
Arms of Thumeries	The arms of Thumeries are blazoned : Argent, 3 pales gules, overall on a canton sable, a lion Or.

== Notable people ==
- Louis Malle (1932–1995), film director, screenwriter and producer

== See also ==
- Communes of the Nord department
