= Peuple en marche =

1963 film directed by Ahmed Rachedi

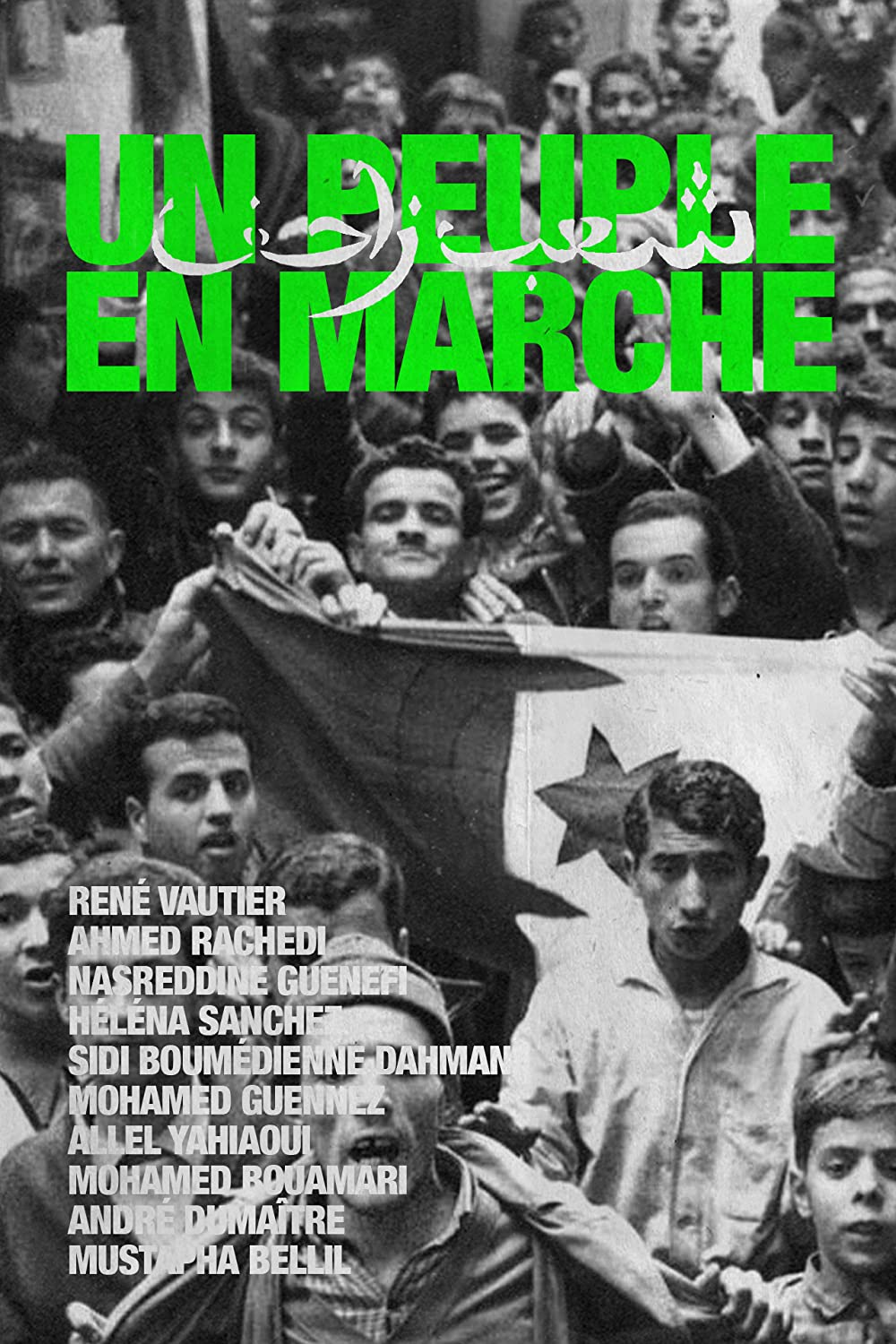
- Directed by: René Vautier; Ahmed Rachedi; Nacer Guenifi; Héléna Sanchez; Sidi Boumédienne; Mohamed Guennez; Allal Yahiaoui; Mohamed Bouamari; André Dumaître; Taïbi Mustapha Bellil
- Edited by: Sylvie Blanc
- Release date: 1963
- Running time: 55 minutes
- Country: Algeria

Peuple en marche (Arabic: شعب زاحف) is a 1963 documentary film.

== Synopsis ==
In 1962, René Vautier, together with some Algerian friends, organized an audiovisual formation center to encourage a "dialogue in images" between the two factions. A film was edited from that experience, but the French police partially destroyed it. The images that were saved represent an unprecedented historical document: They tell of the Algerian War and the history of the ALN (National Liberation Army), as well as showing life after the war and, particularly, the reconstruction of the cities and the countryside after the war of Independence.
