= Afrique 50 =

- Directed by: René Vautier
- Screenplay by: René Vautier
- Produced by: Ligue française de l'Enseignement
- Cinematography: René Vautier
- Edited by: René Vautier
- Music by: Keita Fodela
- Release date: 1950
- Running time: 17 minutes
- Country: France
- Language: French

Afrique 50 [a.fʁik sɛ̃.kɑ̃t] is a 1950 French documentary film directed by René Vautier. The first French anti-colonialist film, the film derived from an assignment in which the director was to cover educational activities by the French League of Schooling in West Africa (in modern Mali and Ivory Coast). Vautier later filmed what he saw, a "lack of teachers and doctors, the crimes committed by the French Army in the name of France, the instrumentalization of the colonized peoples". For his role in the film Vautier was imprisoned over several months. The film was not permitted to be shown for more than 40 years.
