= Laurent Coderre =

Canadian animator, director and musician

- Born: January 29, 1931; Ottawa, Ontario, Canada
- Died: October 13, 2011 (aged 80); Pierrefonds, Quebec, Canada
- Occupations: animator, director, musician

Laurent Coderre (1931 – 2011) was a Canadian animator, director, and musician based in Ottawa, Ontario.

== Artistic career ==
=== Music, painting and medical drawing ===
Music occupies an important place in the career of Laurent Coderre. He learned the trumpet in Ottawa, then started playing in Toronto bars attending local events. Despite some talent, he refused to pursue a professional career in music and traveled to New York. Here he oscillated between trumpet and painting to pay for his studies and his rent. He returned to Quebec afterwards, where his parents are from, to study at the Montreal School of Fine Arts where he received the first prize in anatomy and sculpture. From there, Laurent Coderre switched to the medical drawing field studying at the University of Montreal. He was the first student in medical design, and spent two years dissecting bodies and working in hospitals.

=== Animation and Cinema ===
In 1960, Laurent Coderre joined the English animation team of the National Film Board of Canada, where he directed educational films until 1969. His first animations were on scientific films about the Second World War, mental illnesses, psychology, and mathematics. More and more sponsored films were entrusted to him, which allows him to experiment with new animation techniques, especially paper cut. Close to Norman McLaren, he directed Métamorphoses in1968 following a course on English animation given by McLaren. Created in paper cut within three days, Metamorphoses earned him the silver medal at the Venice International Film Festival. Following this first experience as a director, Laurent Coderre continued to exploit the animated paper cut under camera method to createVisual search to accompany a musical frame, a short film on the visualization of the sounds through the color. This film was never produced by the NFB but incited Laurent Coderre to compose music for films - in particular Bill Mason's documentary short film, Blake (1969).

Laurent Coderre was asked in 1969 to work on the series Contemporary Songs, a series of seven films produced by the NFB based on Quebec music tracks. The song tarmac Flowers by Jean-Pierre Ferland was assigned to Coderre and was created into a short film of the same title. For this film, he uses watercolor on celluloid, a fragile technique but allowing for interesting textures. This four-week short film was awarded the best film prize at the Yortkton International Film Festival and a diploma of honor at the London International Film Festival.

In 1971, he made a third film as a director, this time from thousands of linoleum fragments. Zikkaron, a short film which had the artistic intention of "concretizing the man within the universe", multiplying the allegorical images symbolizing the cosmos and the first organisms on Earth and the human body. This poetic and philosophical movie stands out from the traditional production of the time, where the cartoon is dominant. Laurent Coderre was following the lead of McLaren who considers Coderre his protege to the National Film Board. Zikkaron received the Grand Prize of the French Film Commission at the Cannes Film Festival of 1972.

Between 1973 and 1977, Coderre left aside the production of films to give international conferences and workshops on animated film, while continuing to collaborate on various animation projects. Taking up the subject that was at the origin of Zikkaron (the human condition in the universe), he made two last animated films: Rencontre and Déclin, respectively in 1978 and 1980. He retired from the Office National Film Festival in 1984 to focus solely on painting.

== Filmography ==
- 1968: Metamorphoses
- 1969: The flowers of Macadam (series Contemporary songs )
- 1971: Zikkaron
- 1978: Meeting
- 1980: Decline (Rusting World)
