= Avoir 20 ans dans les Aurès =

- Directed by: René Vautier
- Screenplay by: René Vautier
- Produced by: Unité de production cinématographie Bretagne
- Starring: Alexandre Arcady; Philippe Léotard; Yves Branellec; Hamid Djelloli; Philippe Brizard
- Cinematography: Pierre Clément; Daniel Turban
- Edited by: Simonne Nedjma Scialom
- Music by: Taos Amrouche; Pierre Tisserant
- Release date: 1972
- Running time: 97 minutes
- Country: France
- Language: French

Avoir 20 ans dans les Aurès (English: To Be Twenty in the Aures) is a 1972 film.

== Synopsis ==
A group of young pacifists from Brittany is taken to a camp destined to deserters. They end up by accepting the increasing violence with which they are trained, and become true killing machines. In April, 1961, they are moved to the Aurès mountains in Algeria where they face off against troops from the National Liberation Army. During the battle, the battalion captures a rebel fighter which they shall execute the next morning. Their most precious ideals are supposed to become overridden by sheer discipline.

== Cast ==
- Philippe Léotard as Lieutenant Perrin
- Alexandre Arcady as Noël
- Hamid Djellouli as Youssef
- Jacques Canselier as Coco
- Jean-Michel Ribes as Le curé
- Alain Scoff as Lomic, the soldier
- Jean-Jacques Moreau as Jacques
- Michel Elias as Robert, the teacher
- Yves Branellec as Youenn
- Philippe Brizard as La Marie
- Charles Trétout as Charles
- Pierre Vautier as Pierrick
- Alain Vautier as Lanick
- Bernard Ramel as Nanard

== Prizes ==
- Cannes Film Festival, 1972.

== See also ==
- The Question (film) 1977 French drama
