= Citroën Prototype C =

1955–1956 prototype vehicles

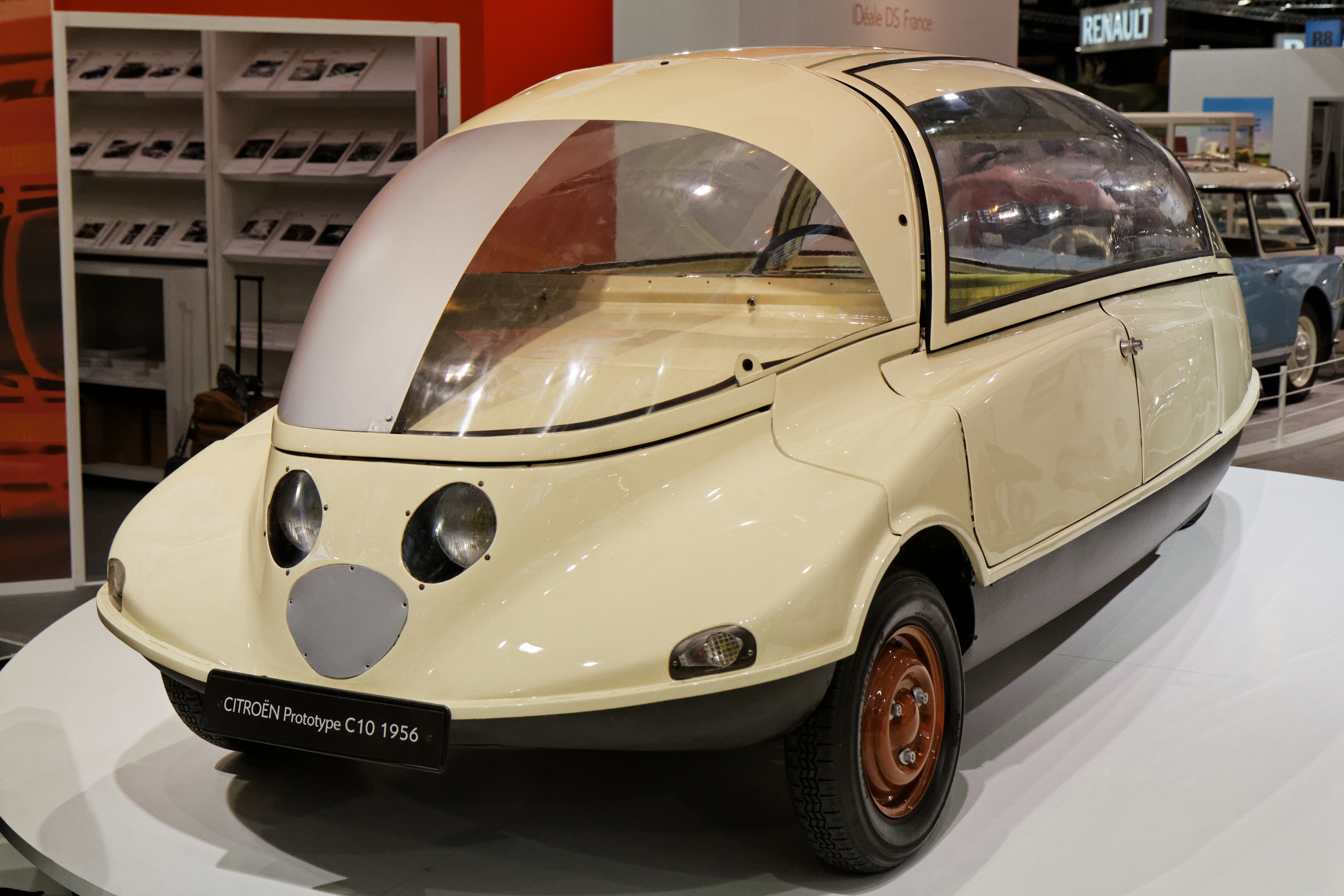
C10 (prototype) on display at the 2014 Rétromobile auto show

The Citroën Prototype C was a range of prototype vehicles created by Citroën from 1955 to 1956 under the direction of André Lefèbvre. The idea was to produce a water-drop-shaped, very lightweight vehicle that would be more modern and smaller than the 2CV. One of the prototypes, the Citroën C10, has survived and is still owned by Citroën.

The overall look of the vehicle was quite similar to the Messerschmitt KR175 bubble car. It was equipped with the same 425 cc engine as the 2CV.

The vehicle was nicknamed the Citroën Coccinelle (French for ladybug).

== Gallery ==
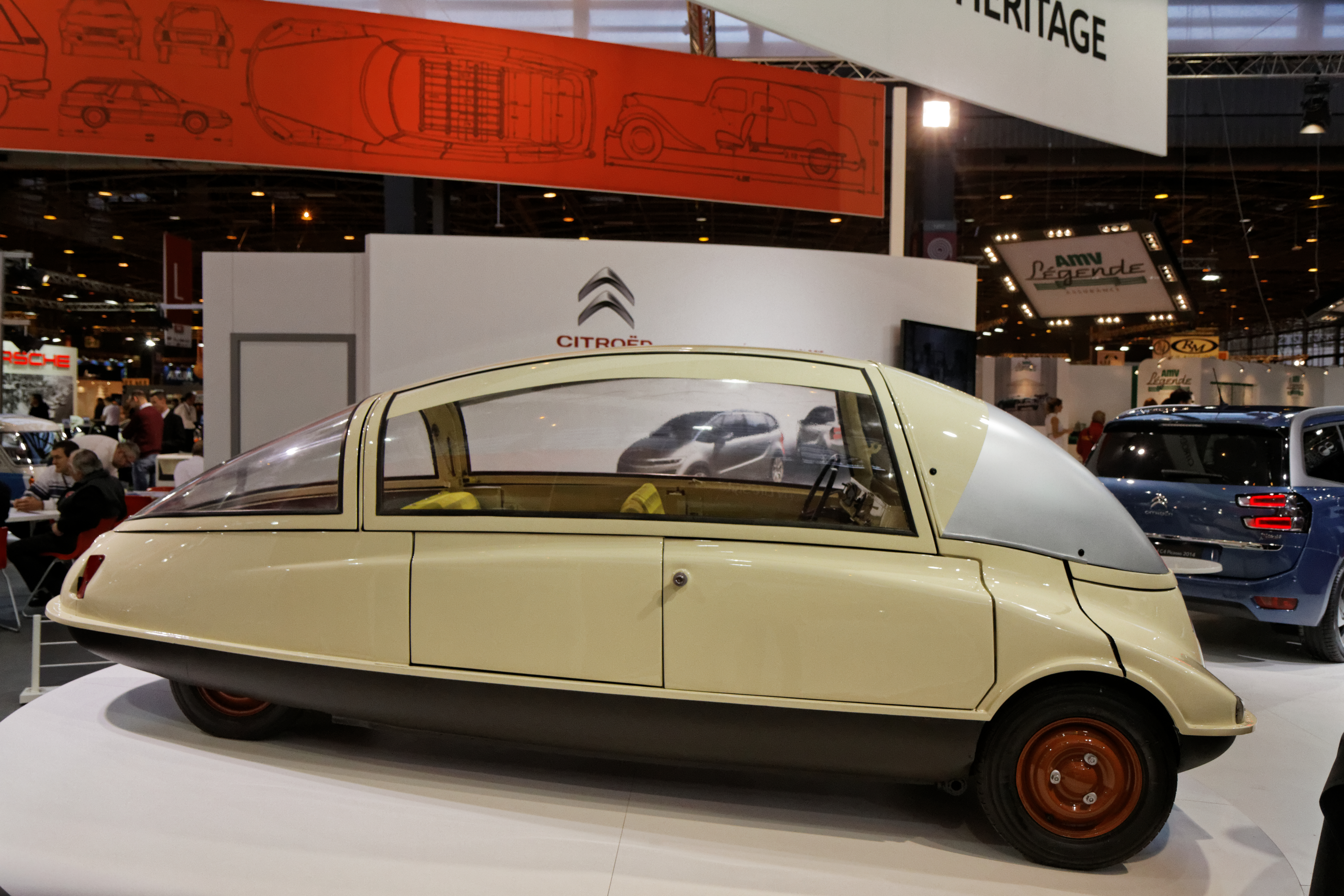
C10 side view

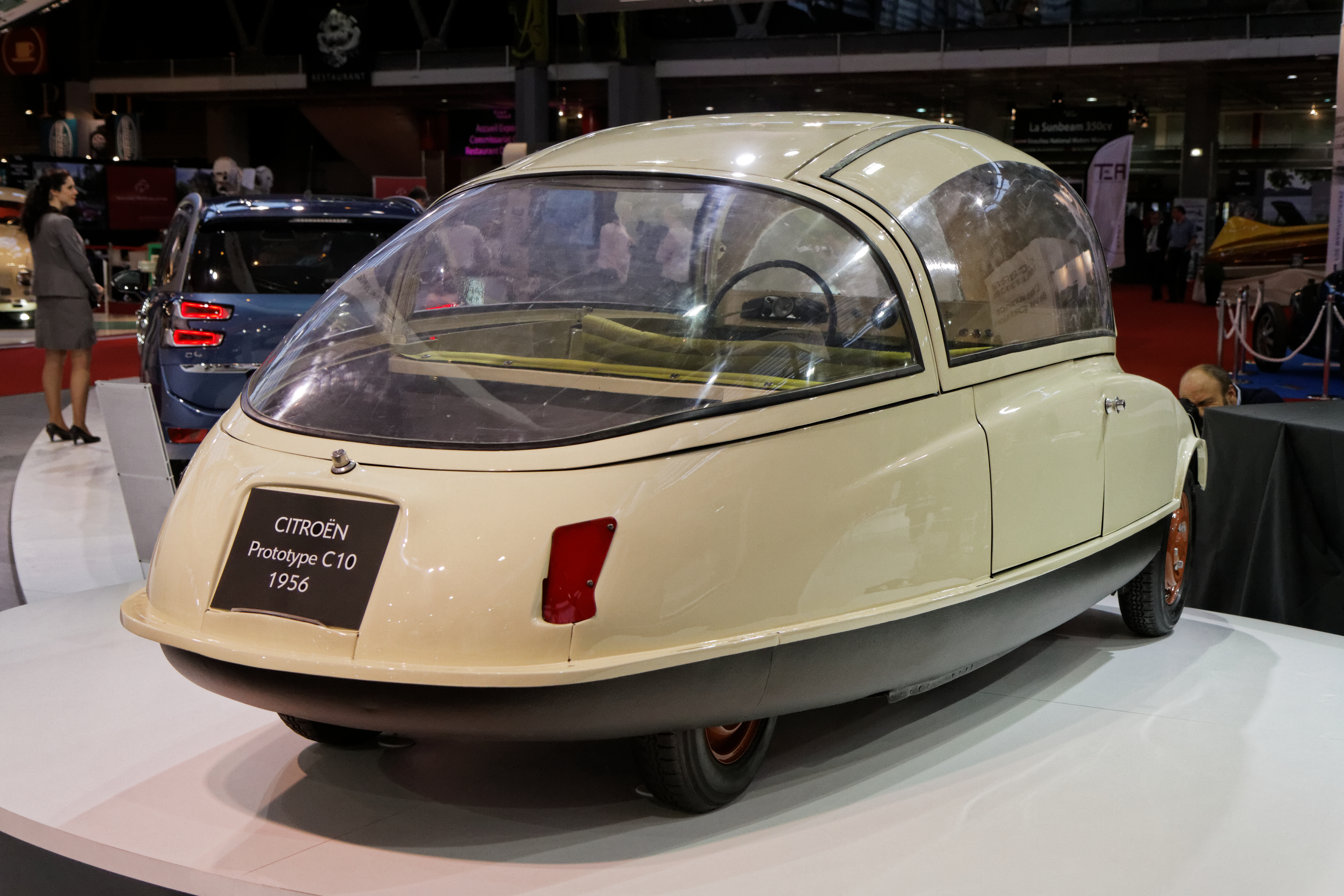
C10 rear ¾ view
