= Humain, trop humain =

- Directed by: Louis Malle; René Vautier (segment director)
- Cinematography: Étienne Becker
- Edited by: Suzanne Baron
- Release date: 1973
- Running time: 72 minutes
- Country: France
- Language: French

Humain, trop humain is a French documentary film by Louis Malle about the operations of a Citroën car production plant.
