= Calcutta (1969 film) =

1969 film

- Film poster
- Directed by: Louis Malle
- Written by: Louis Malle
- Produced by: Louis Kastner
- Narrated by: Louis Malle
- Cinematography: Étienne Becker
- Edited by: Suzanne Baron
- Release date: 16 April 1969
- Running time: 105 minutes
- Country: France
- Language: French

Calcutta is a 1969 French documentary film about Calcutta, directed by Louis Malle. Most of the footage was shot in Calcutta in 1967-1968 alongside Mrinal Sen who was then shooting footage for his film Calcutta 71 and Padatik. Calcutta was entered into the 1969 Cannes Film Festival.
