= Louis Malle =

French filmmaker (1932–1995)

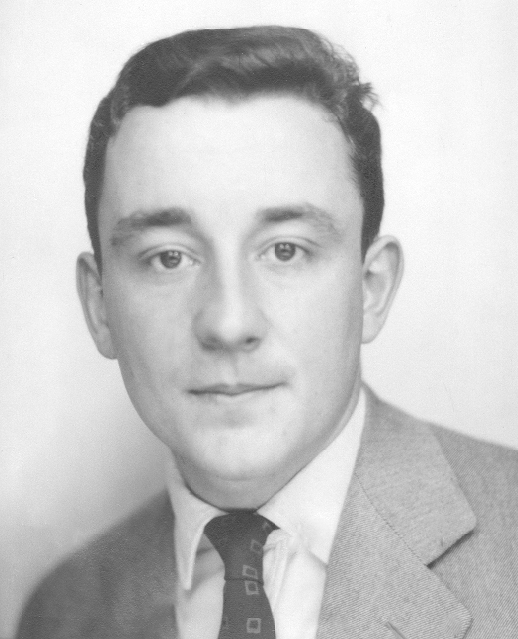
- Malle in 1958
- Born: Louis Marie Malle; 30 October 1932; Thumeries, France
- Died: 23 November 1995 (aged 63); Beverly Hills, California, U.S.
- Education: Sciences Po; Institut des hautes études cinématographiques
- Occupations: Film director; screenwriter; producer
- Years active: 1953–1995
- Spouses: Anne-Marie Deschodt (m. 1965; div. 1967) Candice Bergen (m. 1980)
- Children: 3; including Chloe Malle

Louis Marie Malle (French: [lwi maʁi mal]; 30 October 1932 – 23 November 1995) was a French filmmaker who worked in France and Hollywood. Described as "eclectic" and "difficult to pin down", his works often depict provocative or controversial subject matter.

Malle's most famous works include the crime thriller Elevator to the Gallows (1958), the romantic drama The Lovers (1958), the World War II drama Lacombe, Lucien (1974), the period drama Pretty Baby (1978), the romantic crime film Atlantic City (1980), the dramedy My Dinner with Andre (1981), and the autobiographical Au revoir les enfants (1987). He also co-directed the landmark underwater documentary The Silent World with Jacques Cousteau, which won the 1956 Palme d'Or and the 1957 Academy Award for Best Documentary.

Critic Pauline Kael once wrote that the common quality of Malle's films was the "restless intelligence one senses in them".

Malle is one of only four directors to have won the Golden Lion twice. His other accolades include three César Awards, two BAFTAs, and three Oscar nominations. He was made a Fellow of the British Academy of Film and Television Arts in 1991.

== Early years and education ==
Malle was born into a wealthy industrialist family in Thumeries, Nord, France, the son of Françoise (Béghin) and Pierre Malle.

During World War II, Malle attended a Catholic boarding school near Fontainebleau. As an 11-year-old he witnessed a Gestapo raid on the school, in which three Jewish students, including his close friend, and a Jewish teacher were rounded up and deported to Auschwitz. The school's headmaster, Père Jacques, was arrested for harboring them and sent to the concentration camp at Mauthausen. Malle depicted these events in his autobiographical film Au revoir les enfants (1987).

As a young man, Malle studied political science at Sciences Po from 1950 to 1952 (some sources incorrectly state that he studied at the Sorbonne) before turning to film studies at IDHEC.

== Career ==
Malle worked as co-director and cameraman with Jacques Cousteau on the documentary The Silent World (1956), which won an Oscar and the Palme d'Or at the 1956 Academy Awards and Cannes Film Festival, respectively. He assisted Robert Bresson on A Man Escaped (Un condamné à mort s'est échappé ou Le vent souffle où il veut, 1956) before making his first feature, Ascenseur pour l'échafaud in 1957 (released in the U.K. as Lift to the Scaffold and in the U.S. originally as Frantic, later as Elevator to the Gallows). A taut thriller featuring an original score by Miles Davis, Ascenseur pour l'échafaud made an international film star of Jeanne Moreau, at the time a leading stage actress of the Comédie-Française. Malle was 24 years old.

Malle's The Lovers (Les Amants, 1958), which also starred Moreau, caused major controversy due to its sexual content, leading to a landmark U.S. Supreme Court case about the legal definition of obscenity. In Jacobellis v. Ohio, a theater owner was fined $2,500 for obscenity. The Supreme Court overturned the decision, finding that the film was not obscene and hence constitutionally protected. But the court could not agree on a definition of "obscene", with Justice Potter Stewart famously saying, "I know it when I see it".

Malle is sometimes associated with the nouvelle vague, but his work does not directly fit in with or correspond to the auteurist theories that apply to the work of Jean-Luc Godard, François Truffaut, Claude Chabrol, Éric Rohmer, and others, and he had nothing to do with Cahiers du cinéma. But Malle's work does exemplify some of the movement's characteristics, such as using natural light and shooting on location, and his film Zazie dans le Métro (Zazie in the Metro, 1960, an adaptation of the Raymond Queneau novel) inspired Truffaut to write Malle an enthusiastic letter.

Other films also tackled taboo subjects: The Fire Within (also called Le Feu Follet) centers on a man about to commit suicide. Critic Pauline Kael said it should have solidified Malle's reputation in the U.S. as a great film director but suggested that its commercial failure may have been due to distribution issues. Le souffle au cœur (1971) deals with an incestuous relationship between mother and son, and Lacombe, Lucien (1974), co-written with Patrick Modiano, is about collaboration with the Nazis in Vichy France during World War II. The latter earned Malle his first Oscar nomination, for "Best Writing, Story and Screenplay Based on Factual Material or Material Not Previously Published or Produced".

Malle visited India in 1968, and made the seven-part documentary series L'Inde fantôme: Reflexions sur un voyage and the documentary film Calcutta, which was released in cinemas. Concentrating on real India, its rituals and festivities, Malle fell afoul of the Indian government, which disliked his portrayal of the country, in its fascination with the pre-modern, and consequently banned the BBC from filming in India for several years. Malle said his documentary on India was his favorite film.

Calcutta never opened in New York.

Malle later moved to the United States and continued to direct there. His subsequent films include Pretty Baby (1978), Atlantic City (1980), My Dinner with Andre (1981), Crackers (1984), Alamo Bay (1985), Damage (1992) and Vanya on 42nd Street (1994, an adaptation of Anton Chekhov's play Uncle Vanya) in English; and Au revoir les enfants (1987) and Milou en Mai (May Fools in the U.S., 1990) in French. Just as his earlier films such as The Lovers helped popularize French films in the U.S., My Dinner with Andre was at the forefront of the rise of American independent cinema in the 1980s.

Toward the end of his life, cultural correspondent Melinda Camber Porter interviewed Malle extensively for The Times. In 1993, the interviews were included in her book Through Parisian Eyes: Reflections On Contemporary French Arts And Culture.

== Personal life ==
Malle was married to actress Anne-Marie Deschodt from 1965 to 1967. He later had a son, Manuel Cuotemoc Malle (born 1971), with German actress Gila von Weitershausen, and a daughter, filmmaker Justine Malle (born 1974), with Canadian actress Alexandra Stewart. From 1977 to 1980, he was in a relationship with Susan Sarandon.

Malle married actress Candice Bergen in 1980. They had one child, Chloe Françoise Malle, on 8 November 1985. Malle died of lymphoma, aged 63, at their home in Beverly Hills, California, on 23 November 1995.

== Works ==
=== Film ===
Short film

Year	Title	Director	Writer	Notes
1953	Crazeologie	Yes	Yes	
1954	Station 307	Yes	Yes	Also cinematographer
1968	William Wilson	Yes	Yes	Segment of Spirits of the Dead

Feature film

Year	Title	Director	Writer	Producer
1958	Elevator to the Gallows	Yes	Yes	
1958	The Lovers	Yes		
1960	Zazie in the Metro	Yes	Yes	Yes
1962	A Very Private Affair	Yes	Yes	
1963	The Fire Within	Yes	Yes	
1965	Viva Maria!	Yes	Yes	
1967	The Thief of Paris	Yes	Yes	
1971	Murmur of the Heart	Yes	Yes	
1974	Lacombe, Lucien	Yes	Yes	Yes
1975	Black Moon	Yes	Yes	
1978	Pretty Baby	Yes		Yes
1980	Atlantic City	Yes		
1981	My Dinner with Andre	Yes		
1984	Crackers	Yes		
1985	Alamo Bay	Yes		Yes
1987	Au revoir les enfants	Yes	Yes	Yes
1990	May Fools	Yes	Yes	Yes
1992	Damage	Yes		Yes
1994	Vanya on 42nd Street	Yes		Yes

Acting credits

Year	Title	Role
1962	A Very Private Affair	A journalist
1969	A Very Curious Girl	Jésus
1992	La Vie de Bohème	

=== Documentary film ===
Year	Title	Director	Writer	Notes
1956	The Silent World	Yes		Co-directed with Jacques Cousteau
1962	Vive le Tour	Yes	Yes	Also cinematographer
1969	Calcutta	Yes	Yes	Also narrator
1973	Human, Too Human	Yes		
1974	Place de la République	Yes		Appeared as himself
1976	Close Up	Yes		Short film
1986	And the Pursuit of Happiness	Yes		Also cinematographer and narrator

=== Television ===
Year	Title	Notes
1964	Bons baisers de Bangkok	Short film
1969	Phantom India	Miniseries; Also narrator
1985	God's Country	Also cinematographer and narrator

As himself

Year	Title	Note
1994	Murphy Brown	Episode "My Movie with Louis"

== Accolades ==
- Le Monde du silence (1956)
  - Cannes Film Festival Palme d'Or Winner
- The Lovers (1958)
  - Venice Film Festival Special Jury Prize Winner
- Le Feu follet (1963)
  - Venice Film Festival Special Jury Prize Winner
  - Venice Film Festival Italian Film Critics Award Winner
- The Thief of Paris (1967)
  - 5th Moscow International Film Festival official selection
- Calcutta (1969)
  - Cannes Film Festival Official Selection
  - Melbourne International Film Festival: Grand Prix Winner
- Murmur of the Heart (1971)
  - Cannes Film Festival Official Selection
  - Academy Award for Best Original Screenplay Nomination
- Lacombe, Lucien (1974)
  - BAFTA Award for Best Direction Nomination
- Pretty Baby (1978)
  - Cannes Film Festival Technical Grand Prize Winner
- Atlantic City (1981)
  - Venice Film Festival Golden Lion Winner
  - Academy Award for Best Director Nomination
  - Academy Award for Best Picture Nomination
  - Golden Globe Award for Best Director Nomination
  - BAFTA Award for Best Direction Winner
- Crackers (1984)
  - Berlin Film Festival Official Selection
- Goodbye, Children (1987)
  - Venice Film Festival Golden Lion Winner
  - Venice Film Festival OCIC Award Winner
  - Academy Award for Best Original Screenplay Nomination
  - BAFTA Award for Best Direction Winner
  - BAFTA Award for Best Film Nomination
  - BAFTA Award for Best Original Screenplay Nomination
  - César Awards Best Film Winner
  - César Awards Best Director Winner
  - César Awards Best Original Screenplay or Adaptation Winner
  - European Film Awards Best Screenwriter Winner
  - European Film Awards Best Film Nomination
  - European Film Awards Best Director Nomination

Accolades for Malle's directed features
Year	Title	Academy Awards		BAFTA Film Awards		Golden Globe Awards		César Awards	
Year	Title	Nominations	Wins	Nominations	Wins	Nominations	Wins	Nominations	Wins
1956	The Silent World	1	1	1					
1965	Viva Maria!			2	1				
1971	Murmur of the Heart	1							
1974	Lacombe, Lucien	1		4	2	1			
1975	Black Moon							2	2
1978	Pretty Baby	1							
1980	Atlantic City	5		4	2	3		2	
1987	Au revoir les enfants	2		4	1	1		9	7
1990	May Fools			1				4	1
1992	Damage	1		1	1	1		1	
Total		12	1	17	7	6		18	10

== See also ==
- List of French Academy Award winners and nominees
- List of European Academy Award winners and nominees
