= Koker =

Koker or Kokers may refer to:

- Koker (surname)
- Koker, Iran, a village
- Koker (Guyana), local term for a sluice (water channel)
- Koker (singer), Nigerian afro-pop singer
- Kokers Films, an Indian production company
- Project Koker, a Canadian police investigation of the Hells Angels Motorcycle Club in Edmonton and Calgary

== See also ==
- Koker trilogy, movies filmed in the Iranian village
