= Where Is the Friend's House? =

1987 film by Abbas Kiarostami

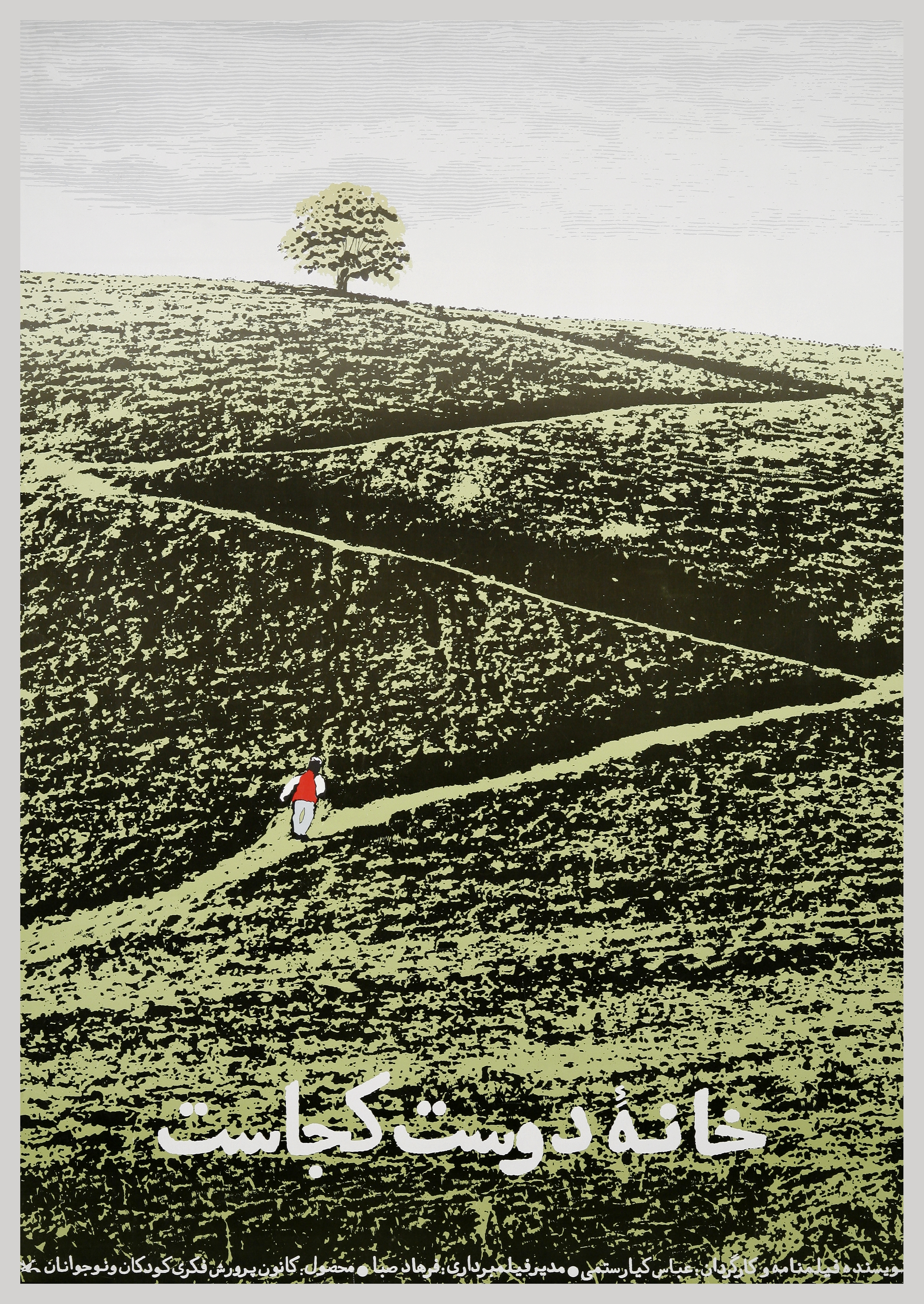
- Film poster
- Directed by: Abbas Kiarostami
- Written by: Abbas Kiarostami
- Produced by: Ali Reza Zarrin
- Starring: Babak Ahmadpour; Ahmad Ahmadpour
- Cinematography: Farhad Saba
- Edited by: Abbas Kiarostami
- Release date: February 1987 (Fajr)
- Running time: 83 minutes
- Country: Iran
- Language: Persian

Where Is the Friend's House? (Persian: خانه دوست کجاست, romanized: Khāne-ye dust kojāst), also known as Where Is the Friend's Home?, is a 1987 Iranian drama film written and directed by Abbas Kiarostami. The plot depicts a conscientious schoolboy's attempt to return his friend's school notebook to his home in a neighboring village, to prevent the friend from being expelled if he fails to hand it in the next day. The film, whose title derives from a poem by Sohrab Sepehri, is the first installment in Kiarostami's Koker trilogy, followed by And Life Goes On and Through the Olive Trees, all of which take place in Koker, Iran.

== Plot ==
Full film

Ahmad, a grade schooler from the village of Koker, watches as his teacher berates a fellow student, Mohammad Reza, for repeatedly failing to complete the homework in his notebook, threatening expulsion on the next offense. When Ahmad returns home, he realizes he has accidentally taken Reza's notebook. Against his mother's orders, he sets out in search for Reza's house in the neighbouring Poshteh, encountering false leads, dead ends, and distractions as he attempts to enlist adults in his search, most of whom ignore him or cannot answer his questions. When night falls, unable to find Reza's house, Ahmad returns home and does both his and Reza's homework in the notebooks. The next day, Ahmad arrives at class just in time, and the homework is deemed excellent by the teacher.

== Cast ==
- Babak Ahmadpour as Ahmad Ahmadpour
- Ahmed Ahmadpour as Mohammad Reza Nematzadeh
- Khodabaksh Defai as the Teacher
- Iran Outari as Mother
- Ayat Ansari as Father
- Sedigheh Tohidi as the Persian Neighbour
- Payman Moafi as Ali, a neighbour
- Teba Soleimani as the Husband
- Aziz Babai as the Waiter
- Nader Gholami as the Property Owner
- Ali Jamali as Grandfather's Friend
- Akbar Moradi as the Old Man from Azerbaijan
- Mohammad Reza Parvaneh as the Man Mistaken for Ali
- Farahanka Brothers as the Young Boy
- Maria Chdjari as the Girl who Stutters
- Hamdollah Askarpour as the Old Man
- Kadiret Kaoiyenpour as the Religious Old Man
- Hajar Farazpour as the Apple Seller
- Mohammad Hossein Rouhi as the Carpenter
- Rafia Difai as Grandfather
- Agakhan Karadach Khani as the Street Vendor

== Commendations ==
Where Is the Friend's House? was Kiarostami's first film to gain major international attention. It won the Bronze Leopard at the 1989 Locarno Film Festival, and the Golden Plate at the Fajr Film Festival. The film is on the British Film Institute's list of 50 films to see by age 15.

On the review aggregator website Rotten Tomatoes, 100% of 11 critics' reviews are positive, with an average rating of 7.9/10.

== Legacy ==
Iranian filmmaker Bahman Ghobadi said that "I always have this film in mind because of the director's profound perspective on filmmaking and its strange and distinct structure".

The Japanese filmmaker Akira Kurosawa cited Where Is the Friend's House? as one of his favorite films.

Jonathan Rosenbaum in 1998 called Kiarostami the greatest living filmmaker and called the film (along with Through the Olive Trees and And Life Goes On) "sustained meditations on singular landscapes and the way ordinary people live in them; obsessional quests that take on the contours of parables; concentrated inquiries that raise more questions than they answer; and comic as well as cosmic poems about dealing with personal and impersonal disaster. They're about making discoveries and cherishing what's in the world—including things that we can't understand".

In 2016, shortly after Kiarostami's death, Werner Herzog called him "one of the all-time most wonderful filmmakers" and cited the film as one of his best.
