= Just J's =

Superyacht launched in 2015

History

Cayman Islands
- Name: Just J's
- Owner: Jay Schottenstein
- Builder: Royal Hakvoort Shipyards
- Yard number: 248
- Launched: 2015
- In service: 2016
- Identification: IMO number: 1012567; MMSI number: 319088500; Callsign: ZGFA8

General characteristics
- Class & type: Motor yacht
- Tonnage: 1219 gross tons
- Length: 61 m (200 ft)
- Beam: 11 m (36 ft)
- Draught: 3.37 m (11.1 ft)
- Propulsion: twin Caterpillar 3512C engines
- Speed: 15.5 knots (29 km/h) (max)
- Capacity: 16 guests
- Crew: 17

The 61 m (200 ft) superyacht Just J's was launched by Hakvoort Shipyards at its yard in Monnickendam. It was designed by Sinot Exclusive Yacht Design, and the naval architecture was done by Diana Yacht Design. It was the largest yacht built by Hakvoort until the 2019 launch of Scout.

== Design ==
Its length is 61 m (200 ft), beam is 11 m (36 ft) and it has a draught of 3.37 m (11.1 ft). The hull is built out of steel while the superstructure is made out of aluminium with teak-laid decks. The yacht is classed by Lloyd's Register and registered in the Cayman Islands. It is powered by twin Caterpillar 3512C engines.

Featuring on the sundeck is a 3x2-metre pool forward with a contraflow system. Among other amenities on board are a gym and a cinema room on the bridge deck, as well as a tender and four jetskis that are launched from large gullwing doors on either side of the yacht.

== See also ==
- List of motor yachts by length
