= Through the Olive Trees =

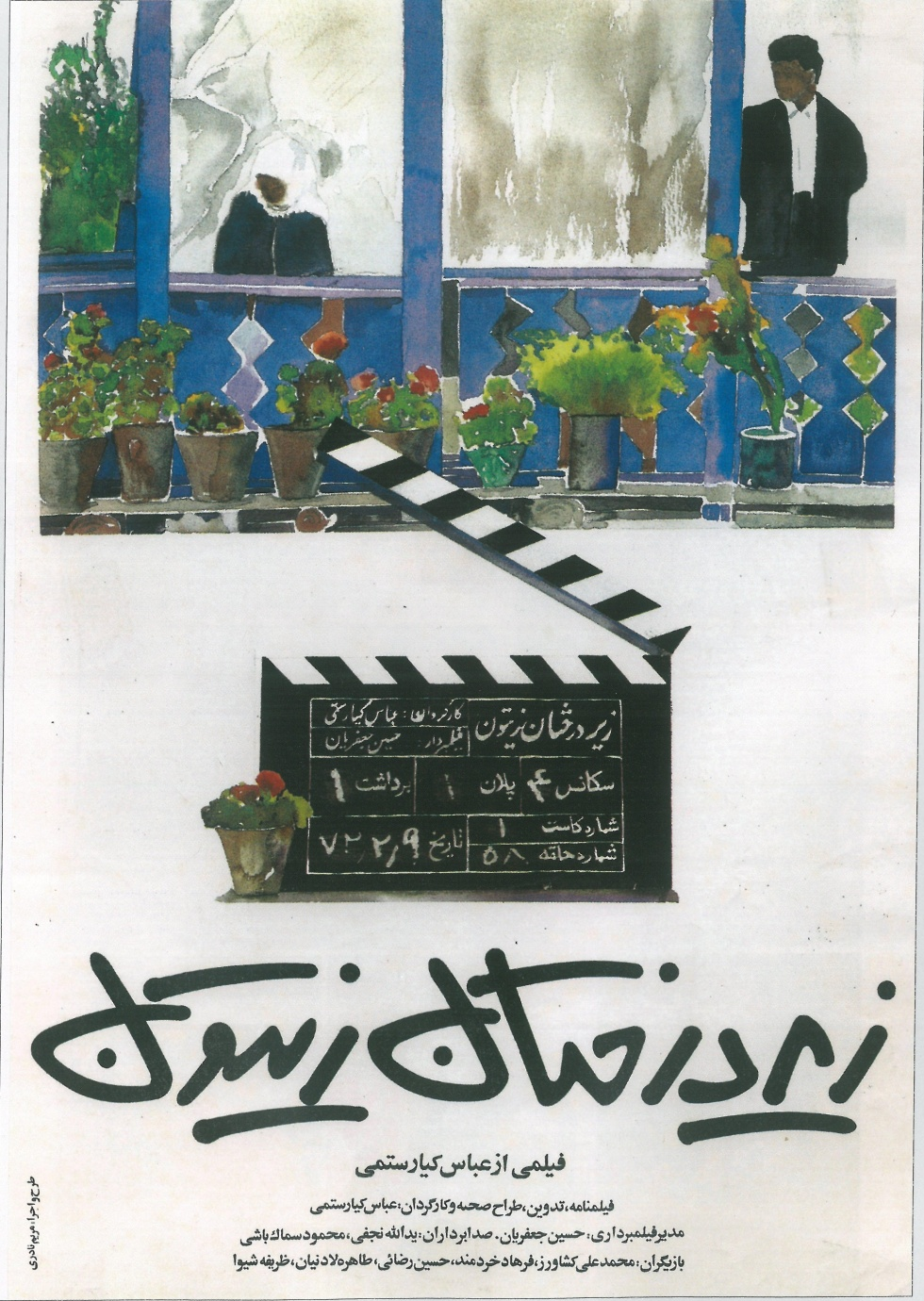
- زیر درختان زیتون
- Directed by: Abbas Kiarostami
- Written by: Abbas Kiarostami
- Produced by: Abbas Kiarostami; Alain Depardieu
- Starring: Hossein Rezai; Farhad Kheradmand; Mohamad Ali Keshavarz
- Cinematography: Hossein Jafarian; Farhad Saba
- Edited by: Abbas Kiarostami
- Music by: Amir Farshid Rahimian; Chema Rosas
- Production companies: Abbas Kiarostami Productions; CiBy 2000; Farabi Cinema Foundation
- Distributed by: Miramax
- Release dates: 1 February 1994 (Fajr); 17 May 1994 (Cannes)
- Running time: 103 minutes
- Country: Iran
- Language: Persian
- Box office: $40,300

Through the Olive Trees (Persian: زیر درختان زیتون, romanized: Zīr-e Derakhtān-e Zeytūn, lit. 'under the olive trees') is a 1994 Iranian drama film written, produced, edited and directed by Iranian filmmaker Abbas Kiarostami. The final part of Kiarostami's Koker trilogy, the plot, set in earthquake-ravaged Northern Iran, revolves around the production of the second film, And Life Goes On, which itself was a revisitation of the first film, Where Is the Friend's House?.

Like much of Kiarostami's work, Through the Olive Trees is filmed in a naturalistic way; a complex study of the link between art and life, its narrative often blurs the boundaries between fiction and reality. The film was selected as the Iranian entry for the Best Foreign Language Film at the 67th Academy Awards, but was not accepted as a nominee.

== Plot ==
Hossein (Hossein Rezai) is a local stonemason-turned-actor. Outside the set of a film in which he is acting, he makes a marriage proposal to his leading lady, a student named Tahereh, who was orphaned by the Manjil-Rudbar earthquake. Because he is poor and illiterate, the girl's family finds his offer insulting; the girl avoids him as a result. She continues evading him even when they are filming, and she seems to have trouble grasping the difference between her role in the film and her real-life self. The fictional couple takes part in what would be the filming of And Life Goes On.

The situation complicates further as Hossein still pursues the affections of the young actress while the film goes on. The director learns about this and subtly tries to advise Hossein about what to do. He then illustrates their story and where the conflict began. The girl manages to finish the scene while Hossein attempts to woo her and then departs by walking as Hossein runs after her.

In the final scene, at a great distance, the girl finally gives an answer to Hossein, who is seen running through a green field and back into the olive grove. The audience is left to wonder what the girl's response was.

== Reception ==
The film was well-received amongst international cinema critics, especially in France, and was nominated for the Palme d'Or at the 1994 Cannes Film Festival. It won the Espiga de Oro at the 1994 Seminci in Valladolid. In particular, its ambiguous final scene has been widely discussed and celebrated.

On the review aggregator website Rotten Tomatoes, 88% of 16 critics' reviews are positive, with an average rating of 7.5/10.

In the 2012 Sight & Sound poll, six critics and four directors ranked Through the Olive Trees one of the 10 greatest films ever made.

Miramax Films had also acquired the United States distribution rights to Through the Olive Trees and the film was given a limited US theatrical release in 1995. However, Miramax Films never released the film on home video, with the film's only American home video release being a Blu-ray from The Criterion Collection as part of the "Koker Trilogy" boxset.

== See also ==
- List of submissions to the 67th Academy Awards for Best Foreign Language Film
- List of Iranian submissions for the Academy Award for Best Foreign Language Film
