= Museum de Speeltoren =

Museum in Monnickendam, Netherlands

- Waterlandsmuseum de Speeltoren
- Location: Noordeinde 2-4, Monnickendam, North Holland
- Coordinates: 52.4594°N 5.0358°E
- Type: History
- Chairperson: Frans Fontaine
- Website: www.despeeltoren.nl

Museum de Speeltoren is a museum in Monnickendam, North Holland, in the Netherlands.

Museum exhibitions focus on the history, culture, art, and environment of Monnickendam. The museum has a large collection of delftware and majolica. They also have an exhibition where guests can go inside the Speeltoren carillon.

In 2015, the museum was awarded the national Dutch "Museum Discover Award."
