= Royal Hakvoort Shipyards =

Dutch shipbuilding company

Royal Hakvoort Shipyard
- Industry: Yacht Building, Shipbuilding
- Founded: 1919
- Headquarters: Monnickendam, Netherlands
- Area served: Worldwide
- Products: Motor yachts
- Website: Official Website

Royal Hakvoort Shipyard is a shipbuilding company specialized in building large luxury motor yachts. It is located in the city of Monnickendam in the Netherlands.

== History ==
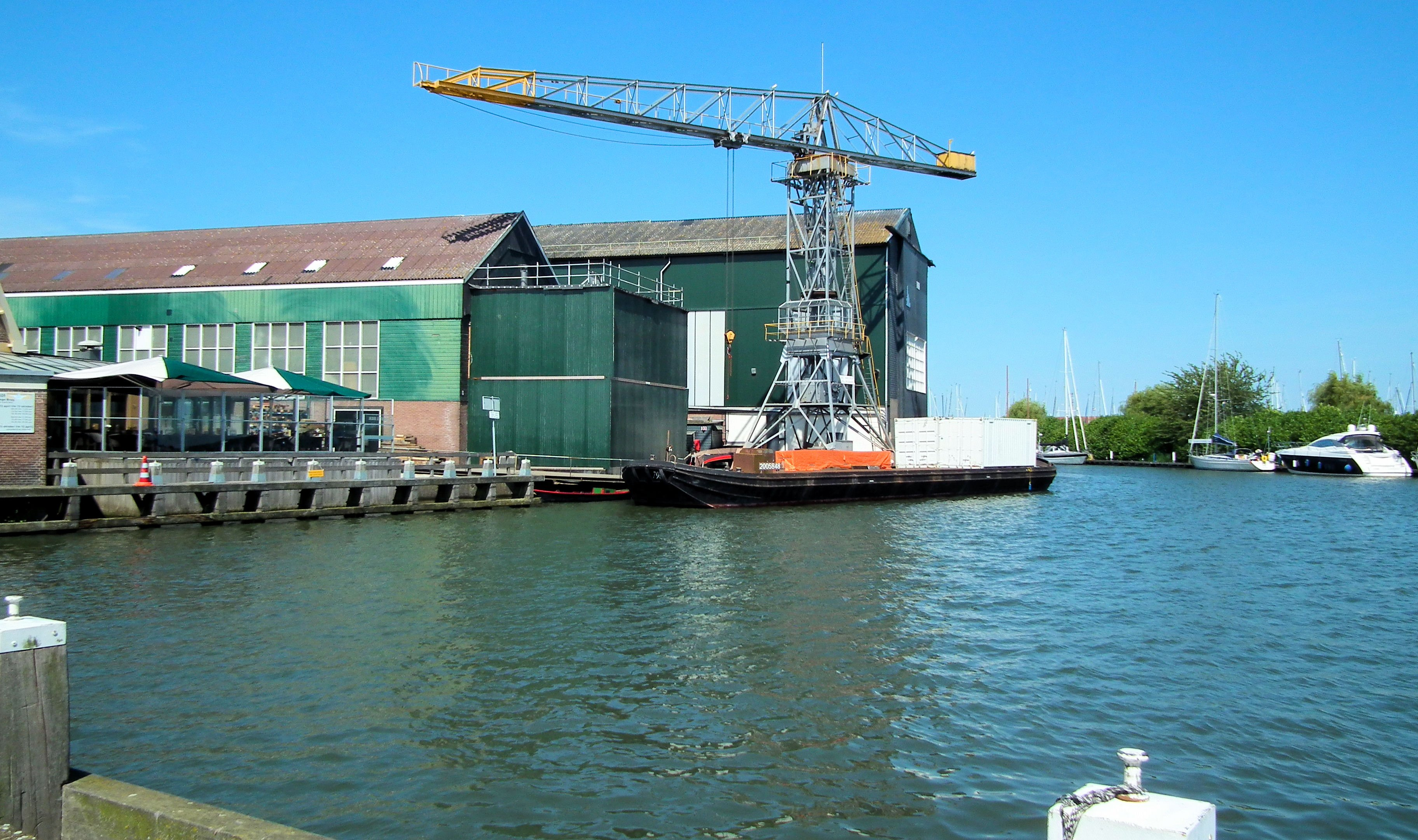
The shipyard, 2012

The shipyard was established in 1919 by Albert Hakvoort Sr. when he purchased ground, a warehouse and shipbuilding equipment in the town of Monnickendam. In 1944 his son Klaas Sr. joined the company. First building wooden vessels they switched to steel after World War II. To aid growth a new slipway was built for the repair and construction of ever larger vessels.

In 1955 they ran into financial trouble after a fire destroyed two sheds and multiple adjacent houses. The financial trouble was caused because the yard was not insured for religious reasons. Albert Sr.'s other son, Albert Jr., left school to help rebuild the yard over the next few years. The family's determination paid off with 70 fishing trawlers being built between 1959 and 1980.

Under the direction of the third generation, Klaas Sr.'s sons Albert and Klaas Jr., the focus shifted from commercial fishing vessels to sport fishing yachts. Klaas Sr. stepped back in 1981 and his sons took over the family business. The first large yacht the yard built was the 31.5 m (103 ft) MY Tonga.

In 1993 Albert bought his brothers share of the company. This was in a period when the yard was collaborating with another Dutch shipyard, Oceanco. Also in this period Albert's sons, Klaas and Albert Jr., joined the shipyard in 1991 & 1993, marking the entry of the fourth generation. A new carpentry department opened its doors in 1999 in the neighboring town of Purmerend.

Some orders were cancelled due to the 2008 financial crisis. As the market for 60 m (200 ft) yachts remained somewhat stable the yard decided to extend their main hall to 66 m (217 ft) to accommodate for this market, which was a big success with orders for a 61 m (200 ft) and a 64 m (210 ft) yachts for Russian owners. However, their order book collapsed after international sanctions against Russia in 2014.

On November 13, 2020, Hakvoort received one of the most prestigious honors for a Dutch company: the Royal designation. From then on the yard can use the Royal title and put a stylised crown above their logo.

== List of yachts built ==
Was the longest yacht upon completion.

Year	Original name	Length overall	Gross tonnage	Notes	Reference
1985	Tonga	31.35 m (103 ft)	188		
1986	Lady Alice	40.71 m (134 ft)	331		
1987	Cricket	36 m (118 ft)	225		
1990	Quaeso III	34.16 m (112 ft)	221		
1991	Lady Duvera	43 m (141 ft)	506		
1992	Sealion	31.55 m (104 ft)	208		
1994	Lady Marina	50 m (164 ft)	658		
1997	Freesia	36.88 m (121 ft)	291		
1998	Spada	33.70 m (111 ft)	271		
2000	Lady Duvera	43.60 m (143 ft)	490		
2001	Mandarine VI	28.06 m (92 ft)		Sailing yacht	
2001	Solaia	40 m (131 ft)	427		
2002	Campbell Bay	44.70 m (147 ft)	491		
2002	Midnight Saga	33.70 m (111 ft)	271		
2004	Flamingo Daze	46.21 m (152 ft)	499		
2004	Tigre d'Or	29.75 m (98 ft)	100		
2006	JeMaSa	49.99 m (164 ft)	696		
2007	Perle Bleue	38 m (125 ft)	360		
2008	My Trust	45 m (148 ft)	499		
2010	Mirgab VI	48.77 m (160 ft)	703		
2010	Pretty Woman	39 m (128 ft)	399		
2011	Pamela V	44.90 m (147 ft)	482		
2013	Apostrophe	39 m (128 ft)	388		
2016	Just J's	61 m (200 ft)	1219		
2017	Soprano	38.25 m (125 ft)	360		
2019	Scout	63.72 m (209 ft)	1412		
2021	Top Five II	61 m (200 ft)	1200		
2022	Milele	45.20 m (148 ft)	499		
2024	Asia	61 m (200 ft)	1,268		
Under construction
Planned delivery	Name	Length overall	Gross tonnage	Notes	Reference
TBA	Project Fast Track	64 m (210 ft)		Originally planned for 2019	
TBA	Project S-Class	61 m (200 ft)	±1200		
2026	Project YN256	45 m (148 ft)	±380		
2029	Project YN258	70 m (230 ft)	±1513		

== See also ==
- Feadship - another Dutch shipyard with a royal charter
- Royal Huisman - another Dutch shipyard with a royal charter
- Royal IHC - another Dutch shipyard with a royal charter
