= Koker (surname) =

Koker is a surname. Notable people with the surname include:

- Anna Maria de Koker (1666–1698), Dutch printmaker and poet
- Danny Koker, (1933–2008), American baritone and pianist
- Danny Koker, aka "The Count", American motorcycle and automobile restoration expert
- David Koker (1921–1945), Dutch Jewish student and Holocaust victim whose diary was published
