= Wendelmoet Claesdochter =

Dutch Lutheran martyr

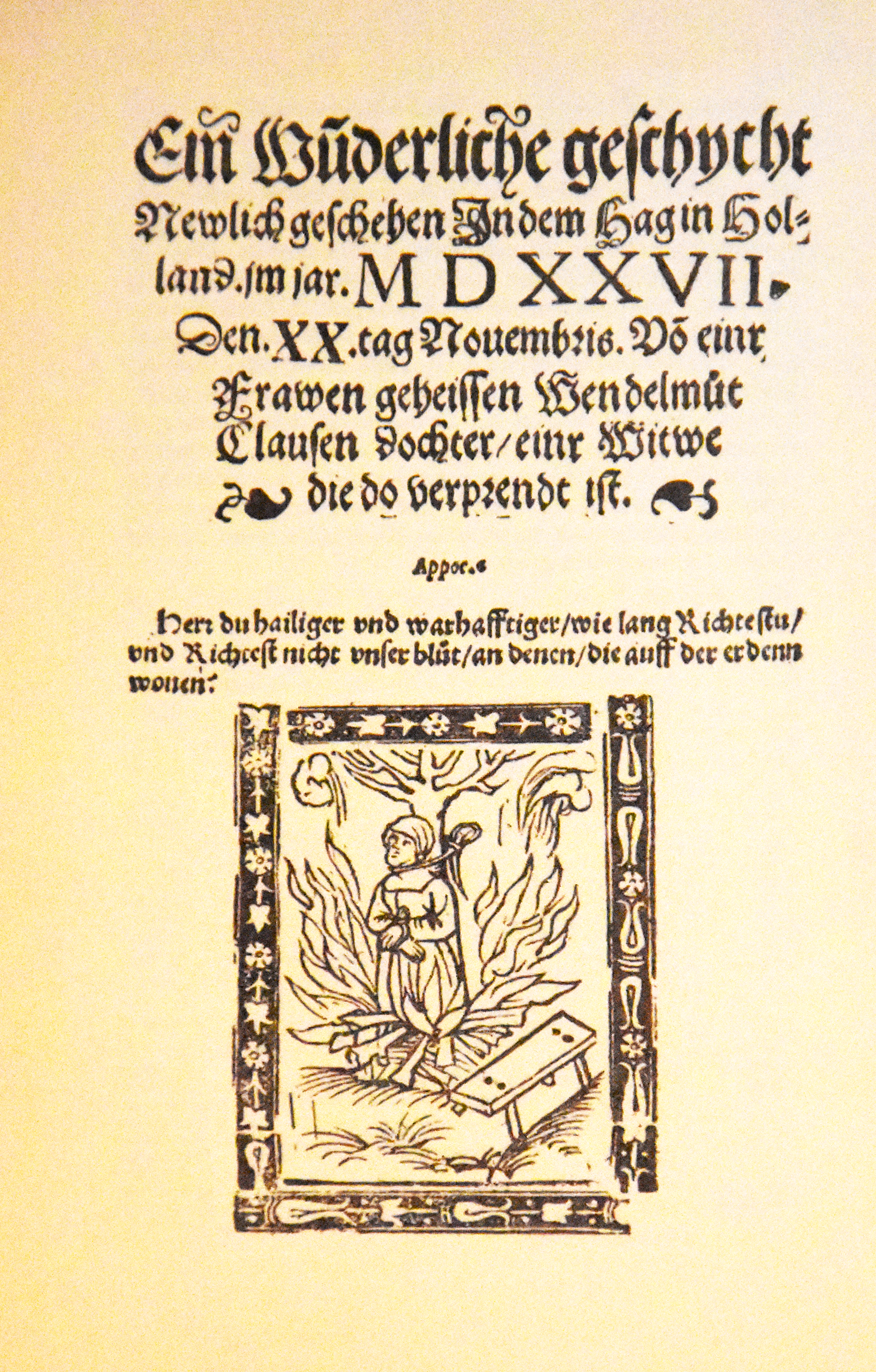
Title page on the details of the burning of Wendelmoet Claesdochter

Wendelmoet Claesdochter (c. 1490 – 20 November 1527) was a Dutch Lutheran who was executed for heresy by strangulation followed by burning, and is known as the first woman victim to the religious persecutions in the Netherlands during the reign of Emperor Charles V.

She was a leading figure in spreading the protestantism in Monnickendam through bible meetings. She was used in propaganda as a protestant martyr, and appeared in the protestant martyrs book Het offer des Heeren since the 1570 edition.
