= And Life Goes On =

1992 film by Abbas Kiarostami

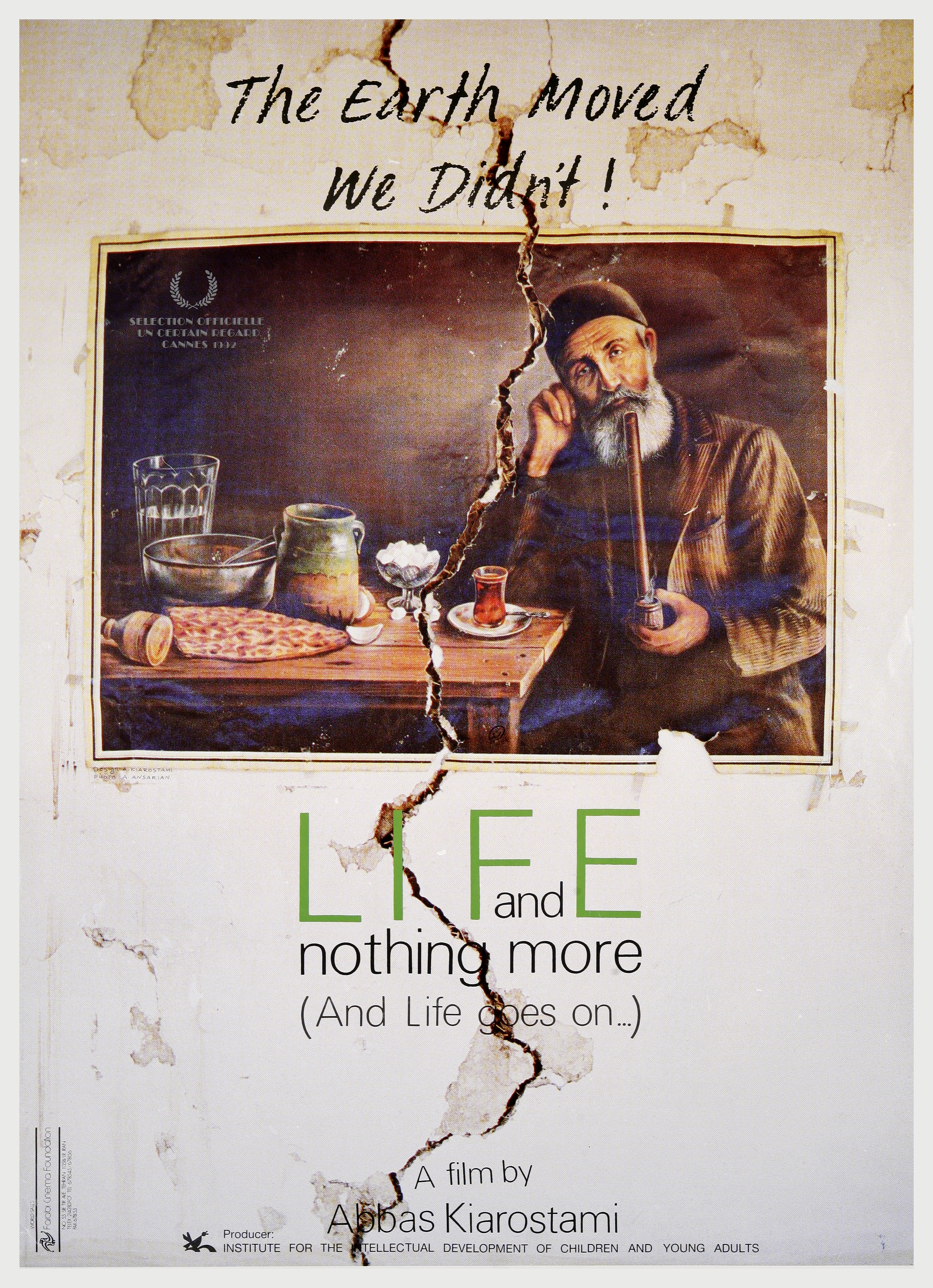
- Film poster
- Directed by: Abbas Kiarostami
- Written by: Abbas Kiarostami
- Produced by: Ali Reza Zarrin
- Starring: Farhad Kheradmand; Pouya Payvar
- Cinematography: Homayun Payvar
- Edited by: Abbas Kiarostami; Changiz Sayad
- Release date: 1992
- Running time: 95 minutes
- Country: Iran
- Language: Persian

And Life Goes On (Persian: زندگی و دیگر هیچ Zendegi va digar hich; also called Life, and Nothing More...) is a 1992 Iranian film directed by Abbas Kiarostami. It was screened in the Un Certain Regard section at the 1992 Cannes Film Festival. It is the second film in Kiarostami's so-called Koker trilogy.

After the 1990 earthquake in Iran that killed over 30,000 people, Kiarostami went to search for the stars of his previous film Where Is the Friend's Home?; this film is a semi-fictional work based on that search. Shot in a documentary style, it shows a director (played by Farhad Kheradmand) on this journey through the country in the aftermath of the devastating earthquake.

== Plot ==
A film director and his son, Pouya, start a journey towards Koker, where approximately half of Where Is the Friend's Home? took place, seeking out information on the star of the picture. During the first half, they search for a highway that would take them to the village, as most of the roads have been damaged or blocked by the earthquake; meanwhile, the two cross paths with several locals (who were also witnesses of the earthquake) and often ask for directions.

After changing their route several times, the two finally reach one of the villages in which the movie was filmed. They visit one of those who acted, and accompany him for a little while. The director and his son visit the destroyed village and hear additional stories of those who survived, among them a young married couple that lost many relatives in the disaster but decided to marry anyway, since the dead did not foresee their demise. One scene featuring this couple is a focal point of the third film in Kiarostami's Koker trilogy, Through the Olive Trees.

Later, the director and his son find another child who acted in the movie and take him to the tents, where people from Poshypa (the neighbouring village to Koker) are living, as their houses have been destroyed. The people have a good television and are gathering to watch an important soccer match. The son of the director wants to watch the match of the football World Cup with the other kids, so his father leaves him there with the intention of returning later to pick him up. He talks to other witnesses of the earthquake and admires the spirit they have had to move on with their lives.

He passes a man carrying a tank and drives up a large hill until the engine begins overheating and he is unable to continue. He gets out of the vehicle and looks up and sees two boys far up ahead (presumably one of whom is the lead). The man with the tank helps him restart the engine. The director seemingly leaves as the man with the tank goes walking uphill. The director's car races several meters before trying to climb the hill again and after he makes it, the director picks up the man with the tank. Following this scene, the credits roll.

== Part in the trilogy ==
And Life Goes On is the second film of the Koker trilogy. The first film, Where Is the Friend's Home?, is a fairly straightforward fiction in which the fourth wall is respected. Following the 1990 Iran earthquake, Kiarostami travelled to the affected area to discover the fates of the child actors who had appeared in Where Is the Friend's Home?. This journey is partly fictionalized in And Life Goes On, which blends fiction with reality. The filming of an episode in this movie is the subject of Through the Olive Trees, which is made in the same style of docufiction as its predecessor in the trilogy.

Each of the films in the Koker trilogy seem to jump to a higher reality where its predecessor is seen as fiction; because of this, the filmmaker himself (Kiarostami) is fictionalized in the second and third film (twice in the latter).

== Reception ==
On the review aggregator website Rotten Tomatoes, 100% of 15 critics' reviews are positive, with an average rating of 8.6/10.

== See also ==
- Docufiction
- List of docufiction films
