= 1990 Manjil–Rudbar earthquake =

1990 severe earthquake centered in northeastern Iran

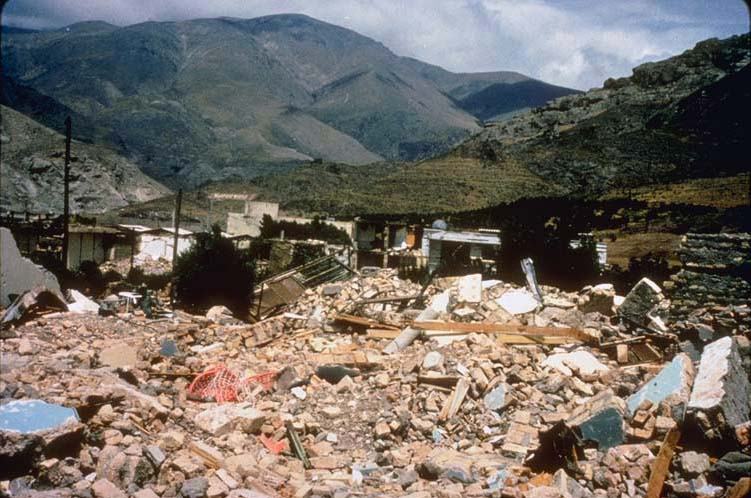
- Collapsed unreinforced masonry buildings

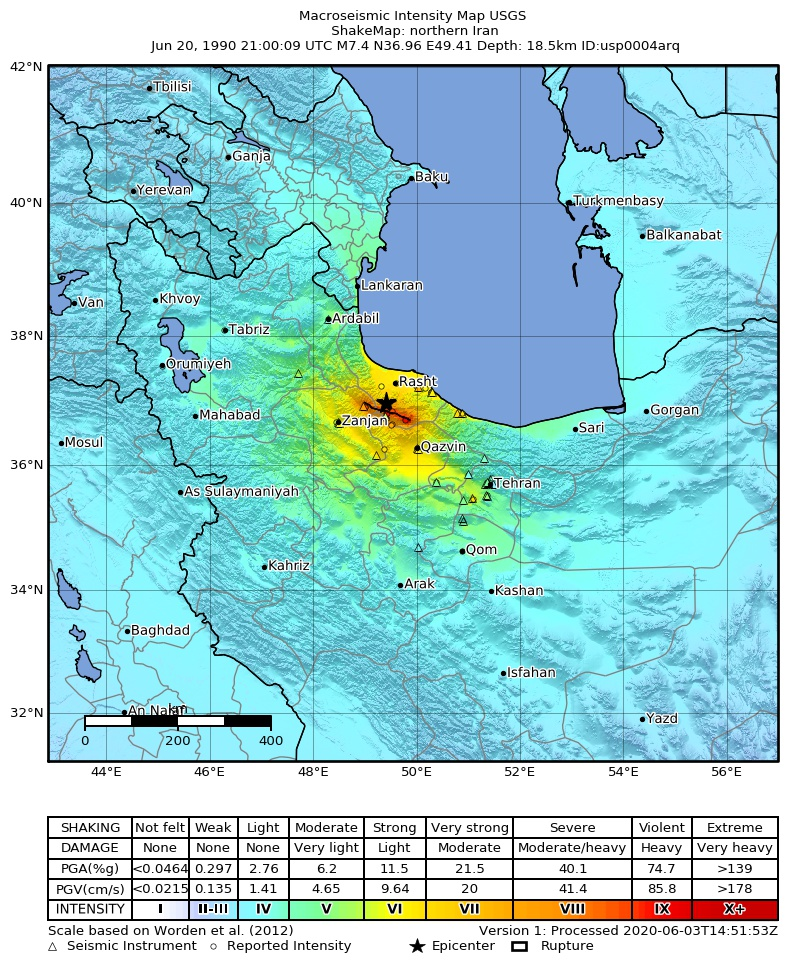
- Strong ground motion map

- Location within Iran
- UTC time: 1990-06-20 21:00:14
- ISC event: 366754
- USGS-ANSS: ComCat
- Local date: 21 June 1990
- Local time: 00:30:14 IRST
- Magnitude: 7.4 M_{w}
- Depth: 15 km (9 mi)
- Epicenter: 37.07°N 49.28°E
- Fault: Rudbar Fault
- Type: Strike-slip
- Areas affected: Iran
- Total damage: $8 billion
- Max. intensity: MMI X (Extreme)
- Casualties: 35,000–45,000 dead 60,000–105,000 injured 105,000–400,000 displaced

The 1990 Manjil–Rudbar earthquake (Persian: زمین‌لرزه ۱۳۶۹ رودبار و منجیل; Gilaki: زلزله رودبار) occurred on Thursday, 21 June 1990 at 00:30:14 local time in the Caspian Sea region of northern Iran. The shock had a moment magnitude of 7.4 and a Mercalli Intensity of X (Extreme). Devastation occurred in a 20,000 km^{2} (7,700 sq mi) area, causing extensive damage in several cities. A large aftershock also added to the destruction. Between 35,000 and 50,000 people died in the earthquake; another 60,000–105,000 were injured.

== Tectonic setting ==
Iran is one of the most seismically active regions in the world. Northwestern Iran lies within northern part of the complex zone of collision between the Arabian plate and Eurasian plate. The Arabian plate is moving northwards relative to the Eurasian plate and the dominant style of faulting in the western Alborz Mountains involves movement on major thrust faults, combined with subordinate left-lateral strike-slip faulting.

== Earthquake ==
The focal mechanism of the earthquake indicate that the event corresponded with left-lateral strike-slip faulting with an epicenter in Gilan province. Surface rupture of about 80 km (50 mi) was observed along three segments of the previously unknown Rudbar Fault. Displacements estimated in the field gave an average of 60 cm left lateral motion combined with 95 cm of vertical motion, much lower than would be estimated from the observed magnitude. Optical correlation techniques using SPOT satellite imagery and aerial photographs have given estimates of 220 cm left lateral movement, better matching the magnitude and suggesting that a significant proportion of the displacement may have occurred off the main fault strand.

On 22 July 1983, a M_{w} 5.5 earthquake struck Mazandaran province, killing 30 people. That earthquake although situated just southwest of the 1990 earthquake's epicenter, is unlikely a foreshock to the 1990 event. The Coulomb stress transfer from the 1983 source fault to the 1990 earthquake source fault was insufficient. Stress modelling showed the 1983 earthquake had decreased crustal stress in the epicenter area of the 1990 earthquake rather than increasing it.

== Damage and casualties ==
Widespread damage occurred to the northwest of the capital city of Tehran, including the cities of Rudbar and Manjil. The total area of devastation was measured to be 20,000 km^{2} (7,700 sq mi). The National Geophysical Data Center estimated that $8 billion in damage occurred in the affected area. Other earthquake catalogs presented estimates of the loss of life in the range of 35,000–50,000, with a further 60,000–105,000 that were injured and 400,000 rendered homeless. The earthquake struck 30 minutes after midnight when most people were sleeping in their basic mud dwellings, a major factor contributing to the high death toll.

The morning after the mainshock, a 6.5 magnitude aftershock hit the city of Rasht, causing a dam to break and creating a large flood and landslide, flooding and wiping out huge swaths of farmland. Other landslides also made many roads unusable, with one landslide next to Rudbar moving up to 20 million cubic meters of land. There were at least 223 landslides recorded within a 11.3 km^{2} (4.4 sq mi) area with a total volume of 380,000,000 m^{3} (1.3×10^{10} cu ft). The earthquake was one of the strongest recorded in the densely populated region of the Alborz mountains.

Damage was extreme in the cities of Manjil, and Rudbar; Khalkhal and Nowshahr also recorded significant damage. In Tehran, the damage was slight. Soil liquefaction also caused extensive damage in an area of about 80 km (50 mi) to the northeast of the earthquake's epicenter, ruining irrigation canals, pipelines, and splitting pavements apart. Water wells were also filled with boiled sand. In some of the smaller, hard-to-reach towns in the Alborz mountains, there were no survivors and no house was left standing. Most buildings destroyed were unreinforced masonry buildings, or UMBs, buildings made out of unsupported brick, cinderblock or other masonry elements which will collapse during strong earthquakes like the Iran earthquake.

== Tsunami ==
The earthquake was accompanied by a small, localized tsunami in the Caspian Sea. The waves were reported to reach 2 meters (6.5 ft) and inundated up to 1 kilometer (0.6 miles) inland. Presumably, an underwater landslide contributed to the notable tsunami, taking place on the steep shores of the continental shelf in the area. Although there were no reported casualties or severe damage in the wake of the tsunami, it reaffirmed the existence of a tsunami in the Caspian Sea and suggested that an underwater landslide that could be caused by an earthquake near the area could cause a life-threatening and potent tsunami.

== Aftermath and relief efforts ==
The earthquake took place as Iran was recovering from the Iran-Iraq war that ended just two years prior. Due to anti-American sentiment in Iran at the time, with the earthquake taking place just 10 years after the Iranian Revolution, Iranians initially did not want to accept help from the United States and other western countries, but they were not in a position to launch an extensive relief effort on their own. The Iranian government and the governments that responded to the earthquake issued over 2,900 tents for the unhoused and camps for hundreds of thousands of people affected by the disaster. 170,000 blankets were also sent in to protect Iranians from the cold.

An unusual outbreak of acute renal failure (ARF) occurred in the aftermath of the earthquake, with the number of victims needing dialysis support rising to 156, with a mortality rate of 14 percent. Patients with ARF were more severely injured and usually had nerve damage, elevated muscle enzymes, and abnormal urinalysis.

== Use in media ==
Iranian director Abbas Kiarostami fictionally incorporated the earthquake and its effects on northern Iran into multiple films of his. In And Life Goes On (1992), a director and his son search for child actors from a previous Kiarostami film; Where Is the Friend's Home? (1986), which was shot in a city that, by the time of the second film's production, is recovering from the earthquake. Kiarostami's next film Through the Olive Trees (1994) follows a film crew as they shoot scenes from Life, and Nothing More...; in one of these scenes a man discusses his marriage having taken place a day after the earthquake. Critics and scholars often refer to these three films as the Koker trilogy, and rank them among the director's finest works.

== See also ==
- List of earthquakes in 1990
- List of earthquakes in Iran
