= Anna Maria de Koker =

Dutch printmaker and poet (1666–1698)

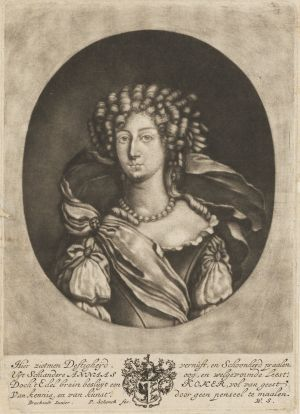
- Anna Maria de Koker by Peter Schenk the Younger
- Born: Monnickendam, Dutch Republic
- Baptised: 12 November 1666
- Children: 1

Anna Maria de Koker (c. 1666 – 1698) was a Dutch printmaker and poet.

== Biography ==
Anna Maria de Koker was born in Monnickendam, Dutch Republic, date unknown. She was the daughter of merchant Jan Agges de Kooker and Anna Francken. Her family was wealthy and had a coat of arms.

In 1684, de Koker married wine merchant Jan Camersfelt in Leiden. According to their son's baptismal certificate from 1685, she was Roman Catholic. She died in 1698 in Amsterdam and was buried on 17 May 1698.

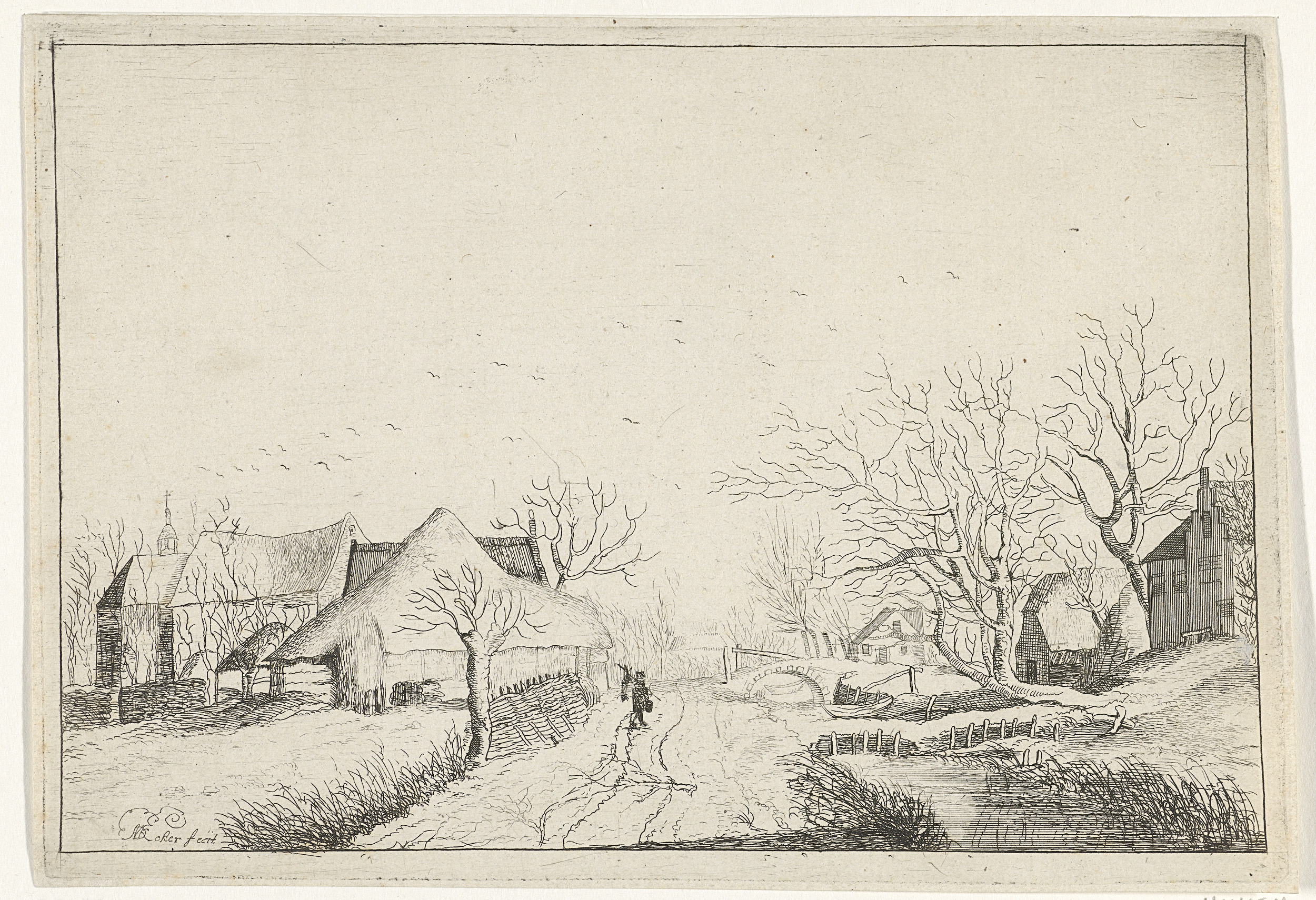
Wintergezicht by Anna Maria de Koker, Rijksmuseum

About twenty five of de Koker's etchings are known, mainly landscapes. She etched twelve landscapes in the style of Dutch painter Jan von Goyen. She also wrote poems.

Landscape prints by de Koker are held in collections of the Rijksmuseum in Amsterdam, the British Museum in London, England, and The Metropolitan Museum of Art in New York City. She was included in the 2025 exhibition "Women Artists from Antwerp to Amsterdam, 1600-1750" at the Museum of Fine Arts in Ghent, Belgium.
