= Koker, Iran =

Village in Gilan province, Iran

Coordinates: 36.916021°N 49.484453°E

Koker (Persian: کوکر) is a small mud-brick village in Rudbar County, Gilan province, Iran. In the early 1990s the well-known Koker trilogy of films, directed by Abbas Kiarostami, were filmed in the village, which was devastated by the 1990 earthquake.
