= Monnickendam =

- City
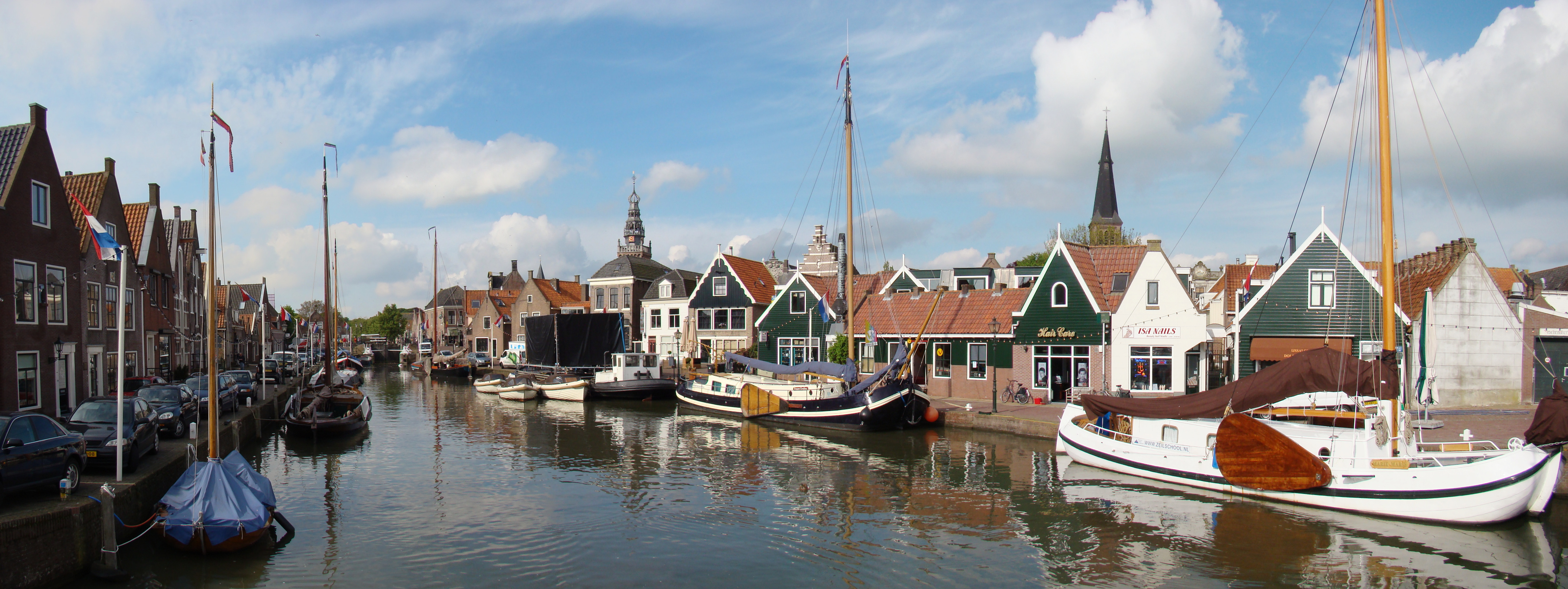
- Monnickendam in 2010

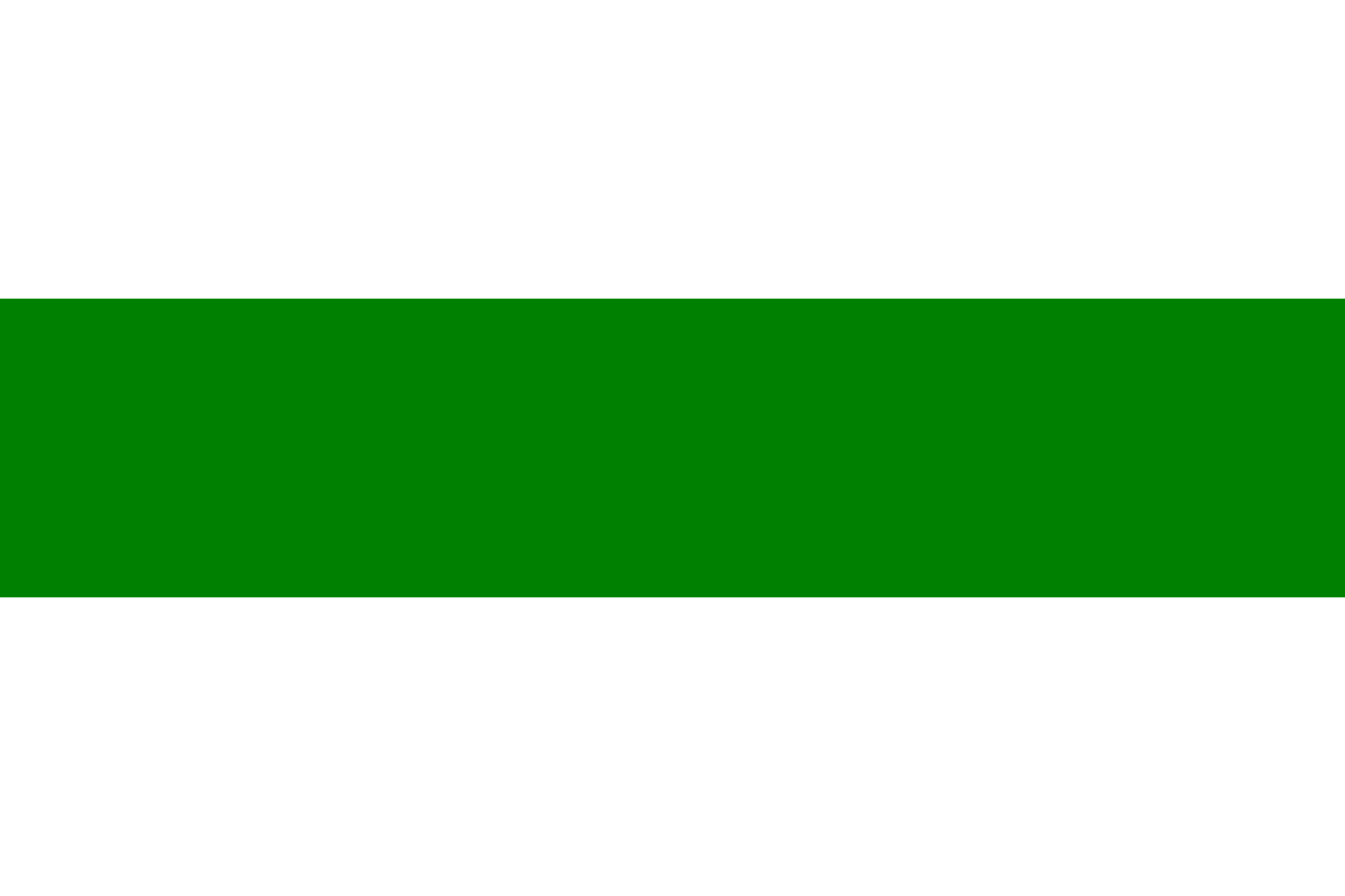
- Flag Coat of arms

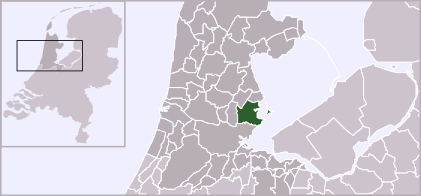

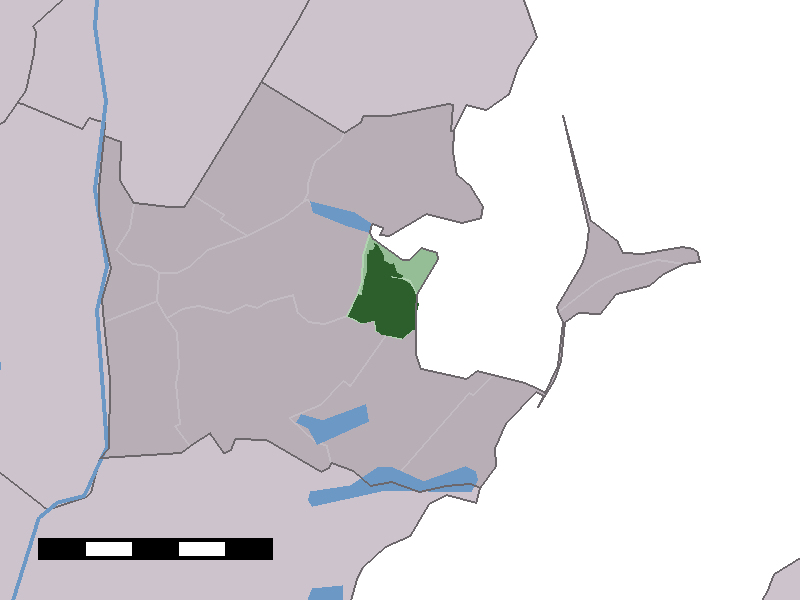
- The town centre (dark green) and the statistical district (light green) of Monnickendam in the municipality of Waterland
- Coordinates: 52°28′N 5°2′E
- Country: Netherlands
- Province: North Holland
- Municipality: Waterland

Area (2012)
  - Total: 1,536 ha (3,800 acres)
  - Land: 1,464 ha (3,620 acres)
  - Water: 72 ha (180 acres)

Population (2012)
  - Total: 9,915
  - Density: 677.3/km^{2} (1,754/sq mi)
- Postal code: 1140–1141
- Area code: 0299

Monnickendam (Dutch pronunciation: [ˌmɔnɪkə(n)ˈdɑm]) is a city in the Dutch province of North Holland. It is a part of the municipality of Waterland, and lies on the coast of the Markermeer, about 8 km (5.0 mi) southeast of Purmerend. It received city rights in 1355 and was damaged by the fires of 1499 and 1513.

== History ==
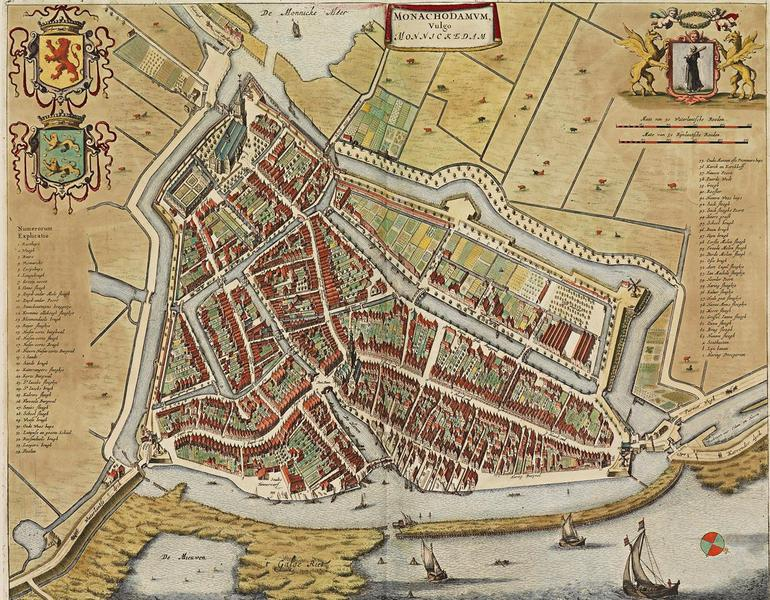
Joan Blaeu's map of Monnickendam, developed in 1649

Monnikendam was also the name of a number of warships built at the port of the same name during the Anglo-Dutch Wars.

The town was founded by monks, the name Monnickendam translates as 'Monk's dam'.

Monnickendam was a separate municipality until 1991, when it was merged into Waterland. Although it is a small fishing village today, it was an important port in earlier centuries. It possesses a seventeenth-century weigh house, once used by merchants and port officials, and a bell tower that dates from 1591. The fourteenth century church of St. Nicholas, renovated in 1602, is particularly notable. The synagogue was built in 1894. Jewish families named Monnikendam trace their roots to this town.

The town was the site of an artist's colony in the early twentieth century.

== Economy ==
Monnickendam hosts a number of industries, many related to its history and proximity to the Markermeer. Notably, the city is home to the Royal Hakvoort Shipyards that has operated for over a century, first catering to the local fishing industry by building vessels for their purpose, and later moving into luxury and pleasure crafts.

Other notable organisations include Leguit + Roos, specialising in the renovation and restoration of historical buildings that are plenty in the Waterland area.

In recent developments, the derelict business quarter of Galgeriet was demolished in order to make space for the development of new residential buildings. The Dutch government has subsidised this development with €6,420,240, with the hope of creating 700 homes as well as additional commercial spaces to both alleviate the ailing demography and provide an impetus for further economic growth.

== Demographics ==
In 2001, the town of Monnickendam had 9,546 inhabitants. The built-up area of the town was 1.34 km^{2} (0.52 sq mi), and contained 3,766 residences. The wider statistical area of Monnickendam has a population of around 9,680.

== Notable people ==
- Wendelmoet Claesdochter, first female Lutheran martyr during the Reformation, executed in 1527 at The Hague
- Cornelis Dirkszoon, mayor of Monnickendam during the Eighty Years' War
- Hermann Jung (1608–1678), prominent Lutheran theologian and preacher
- Anna Maria de Koker (1666–1698), printmaker and poet
- Simon Lambrechtszoon Mau, captain of the Duyfken who led the first expedition to the Dutch East Indies using a route around Africa
- Marlou van Rhijn, two-time 200 metre gold medal winner at the 2012 and 2016 Paralympics

== Gallery ==
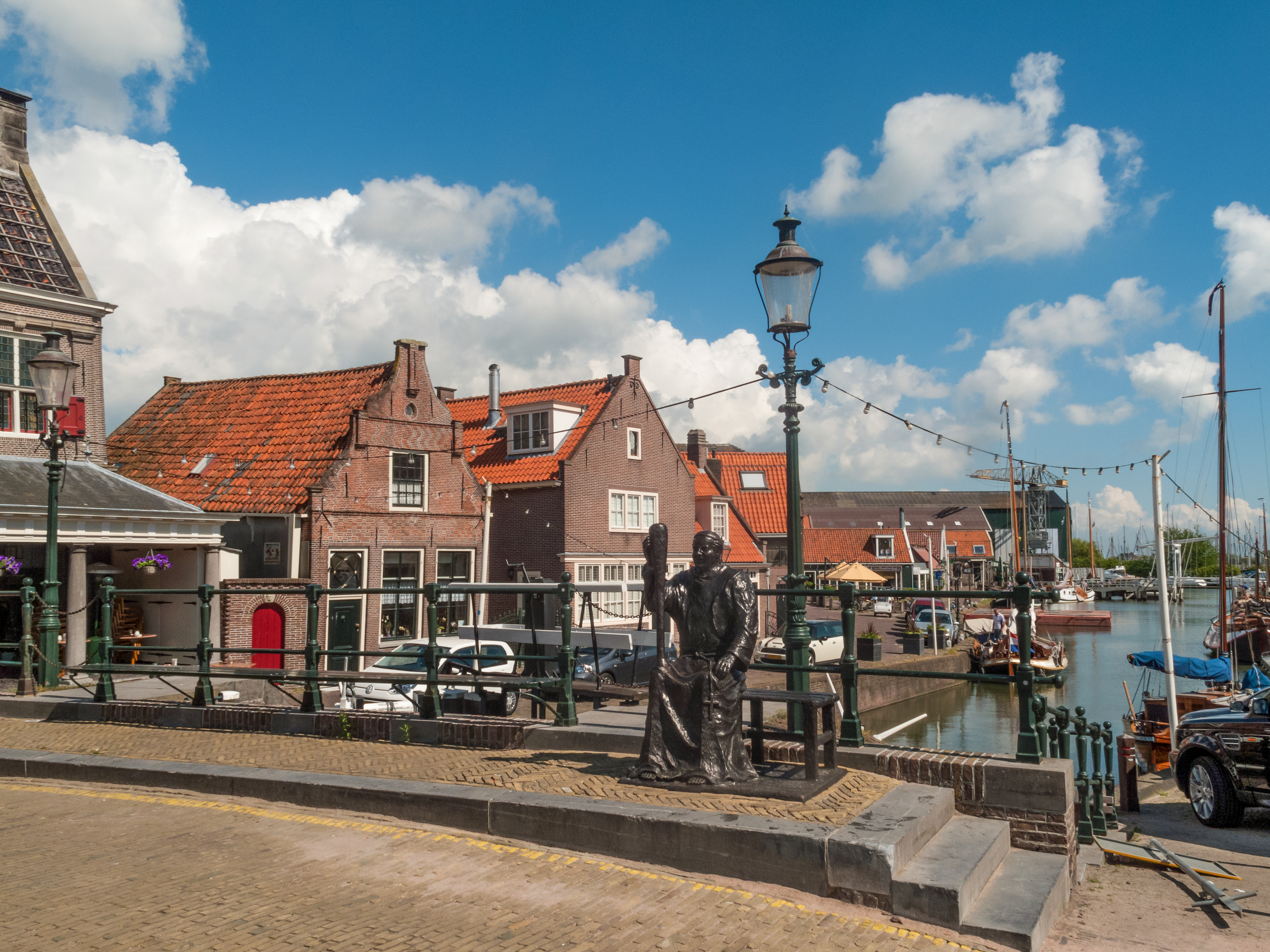
Monk sculpture at the bridge near the Waag

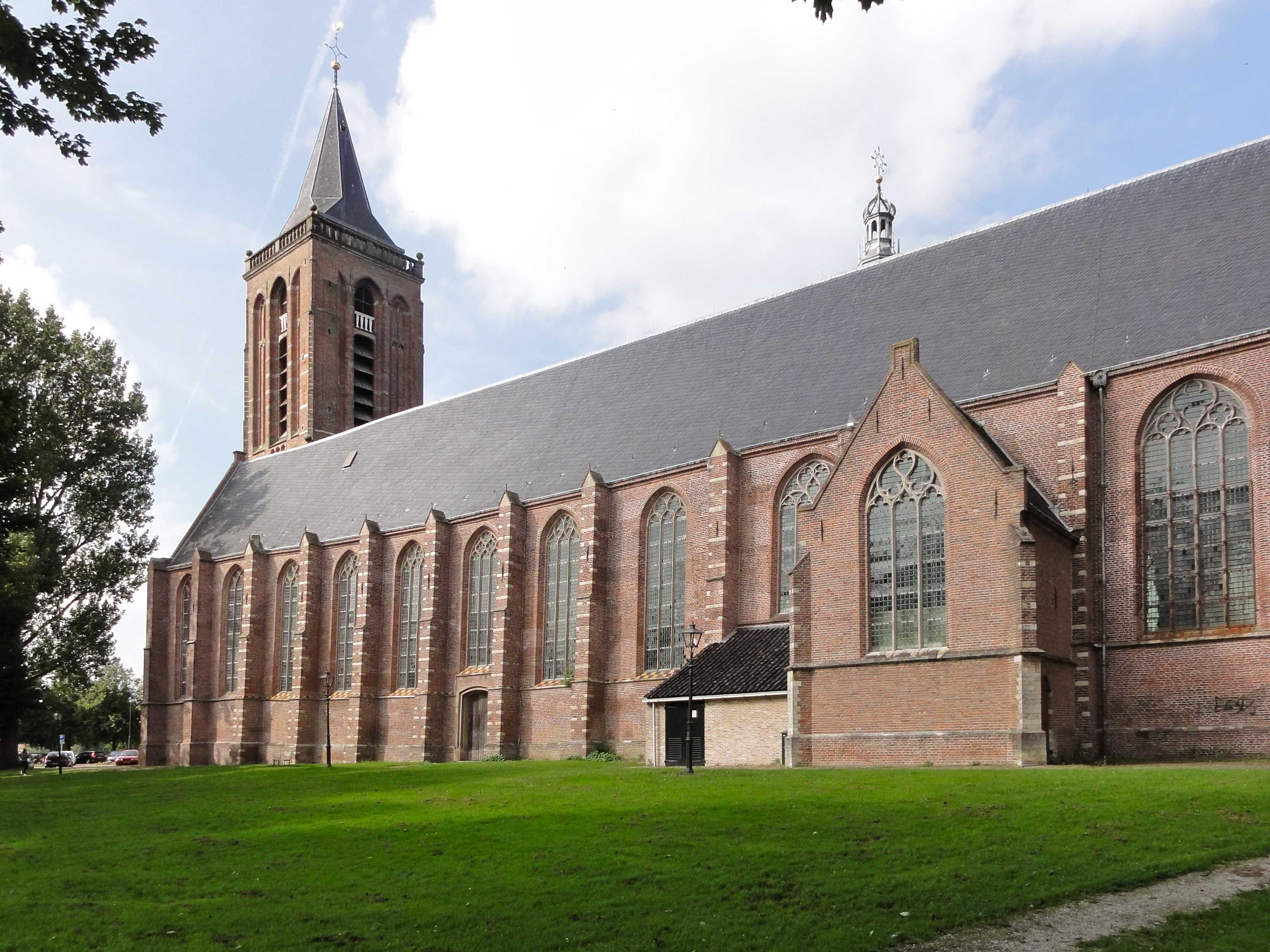
Church: Grote of Sint Nicolaaskerk

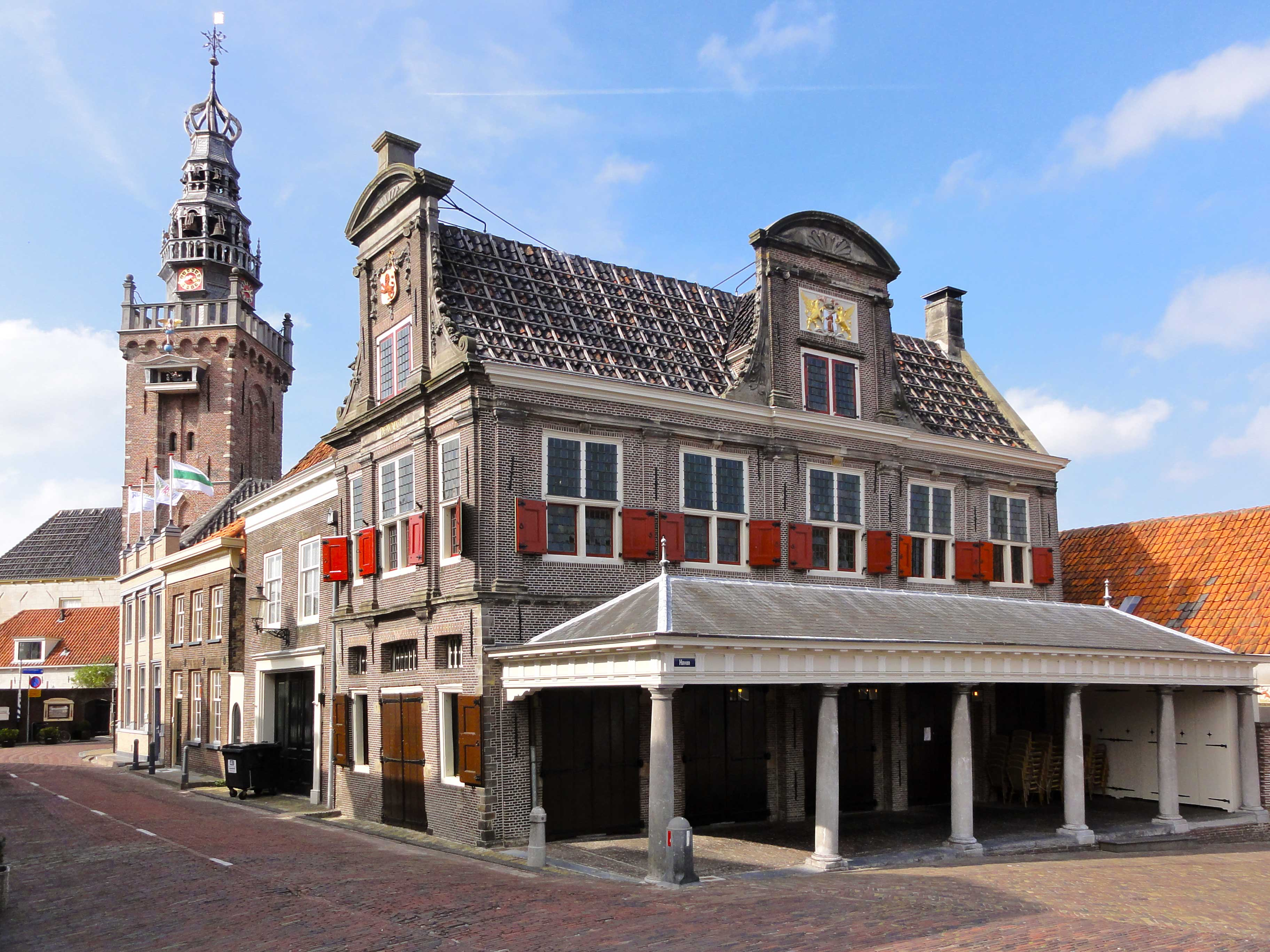
Tower (Speeltoren) and the Waag

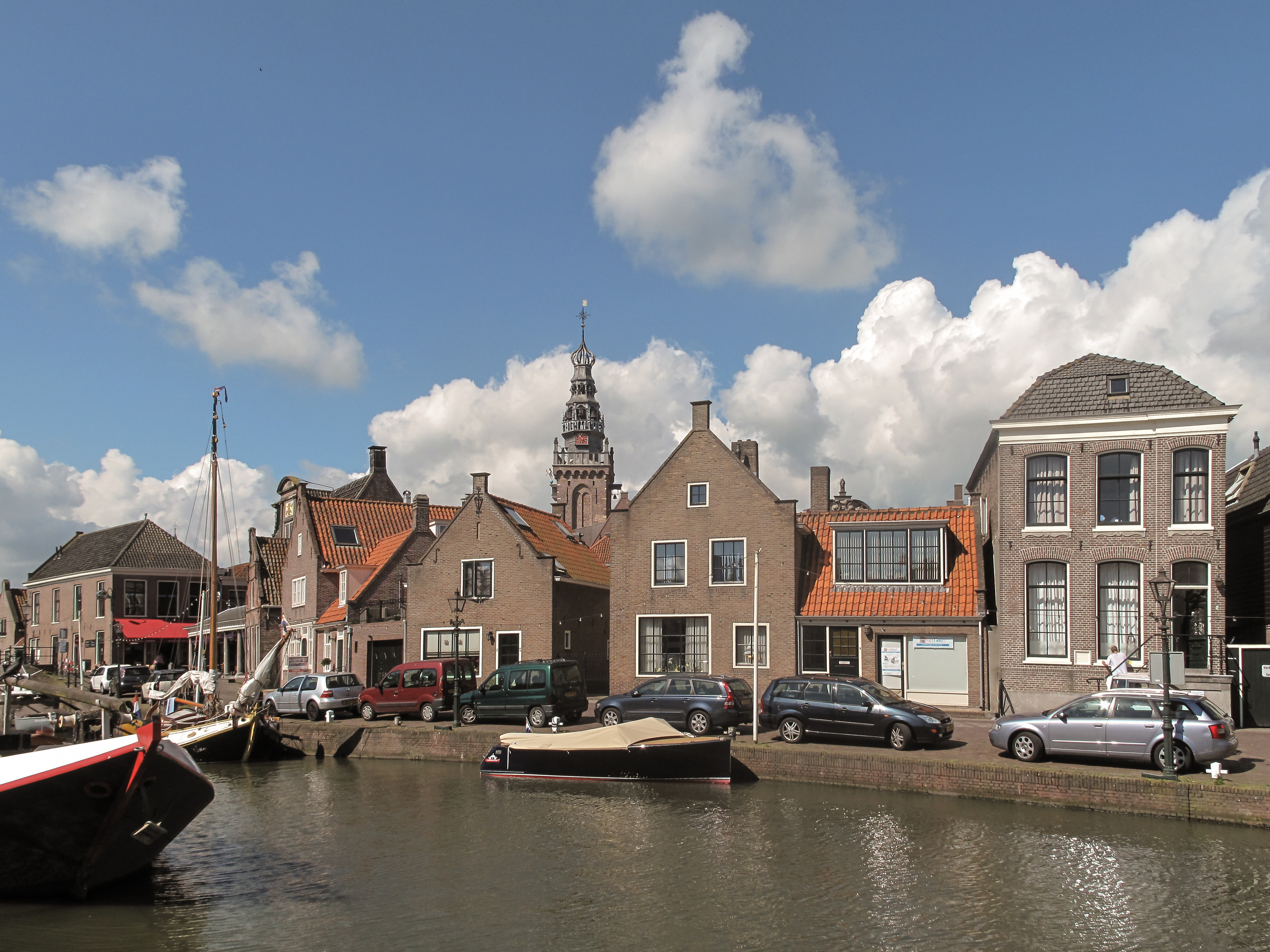
View to the port

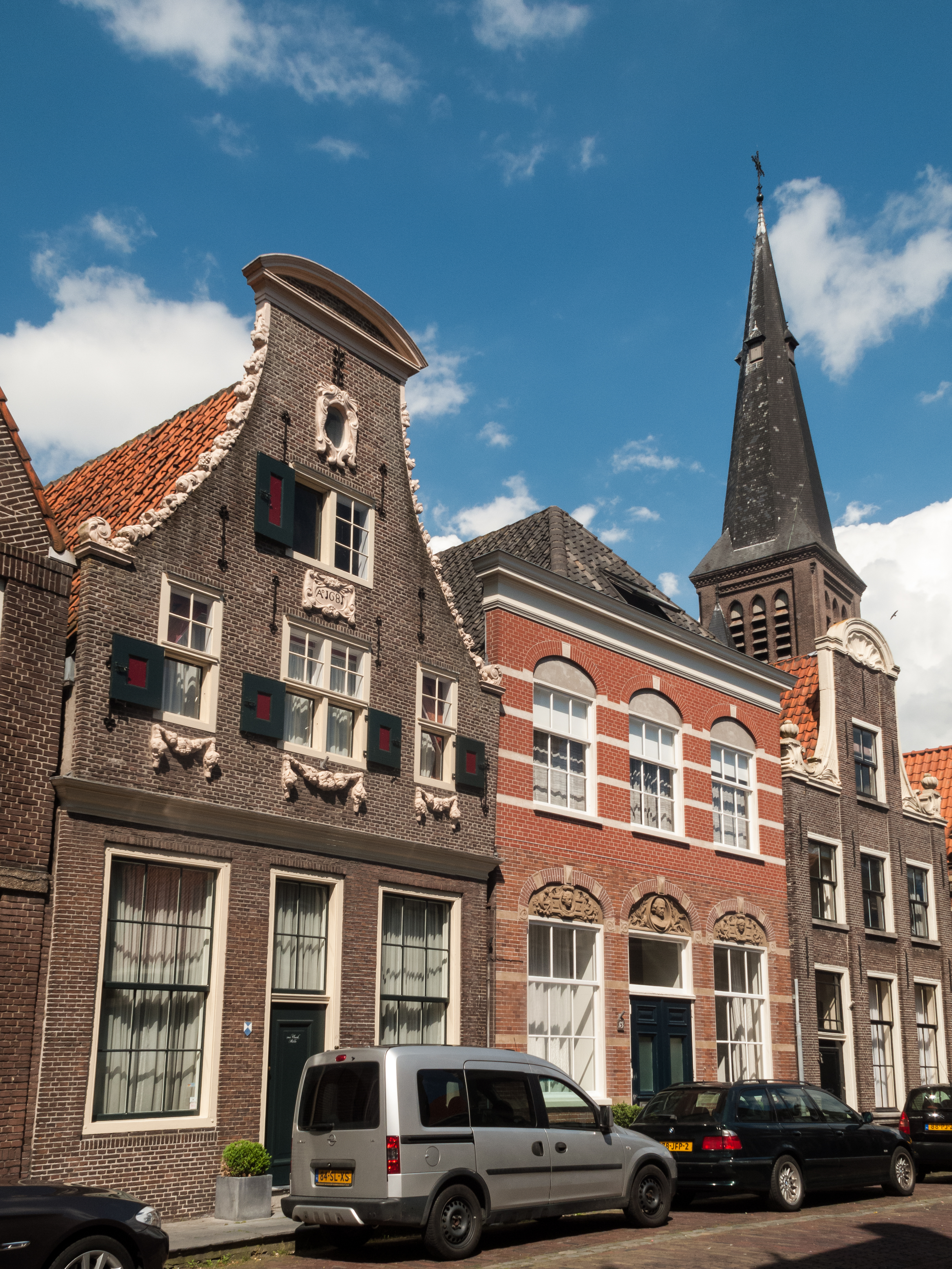
View to a street (het Noordeinde)

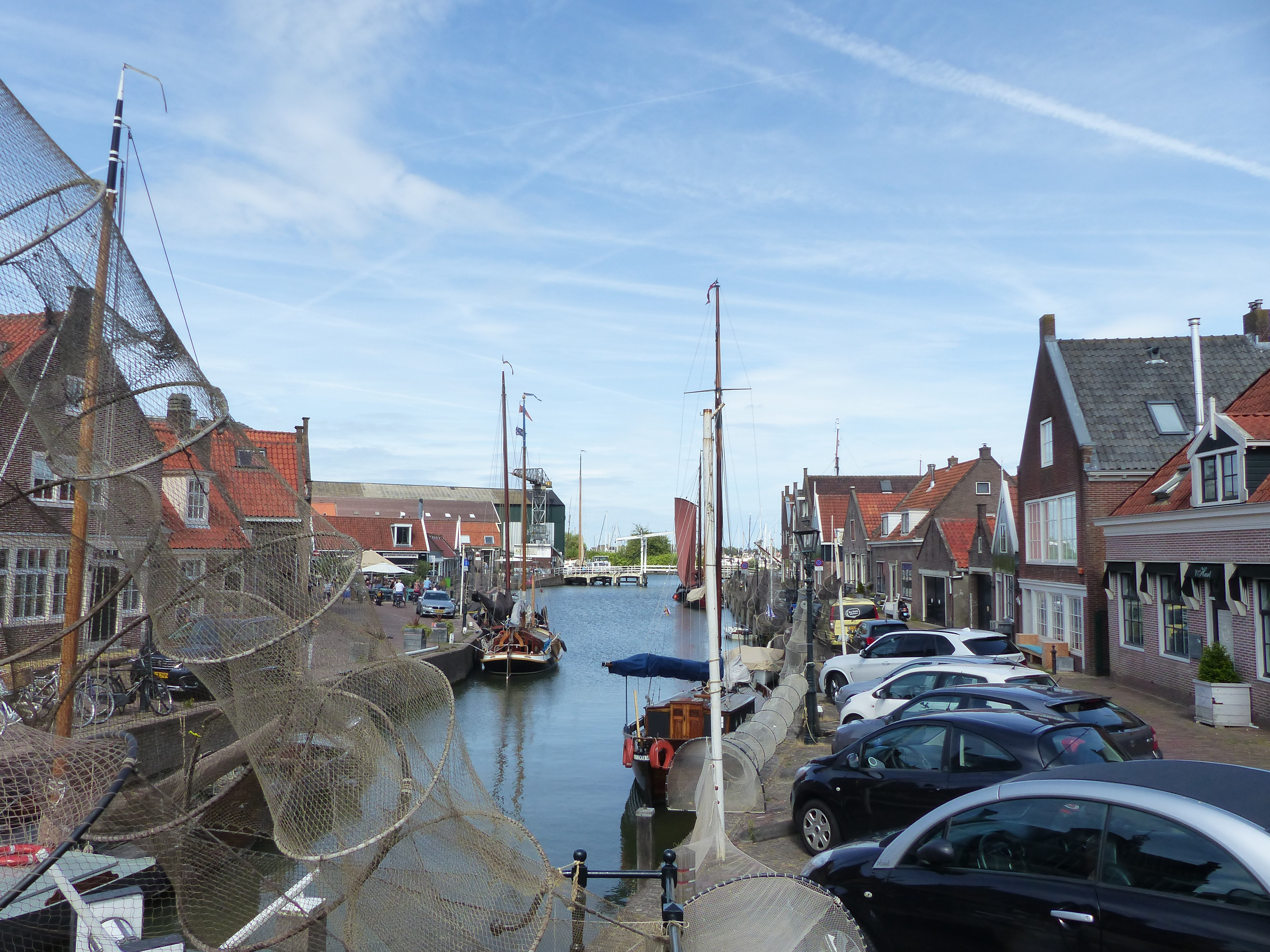
View to the grachten

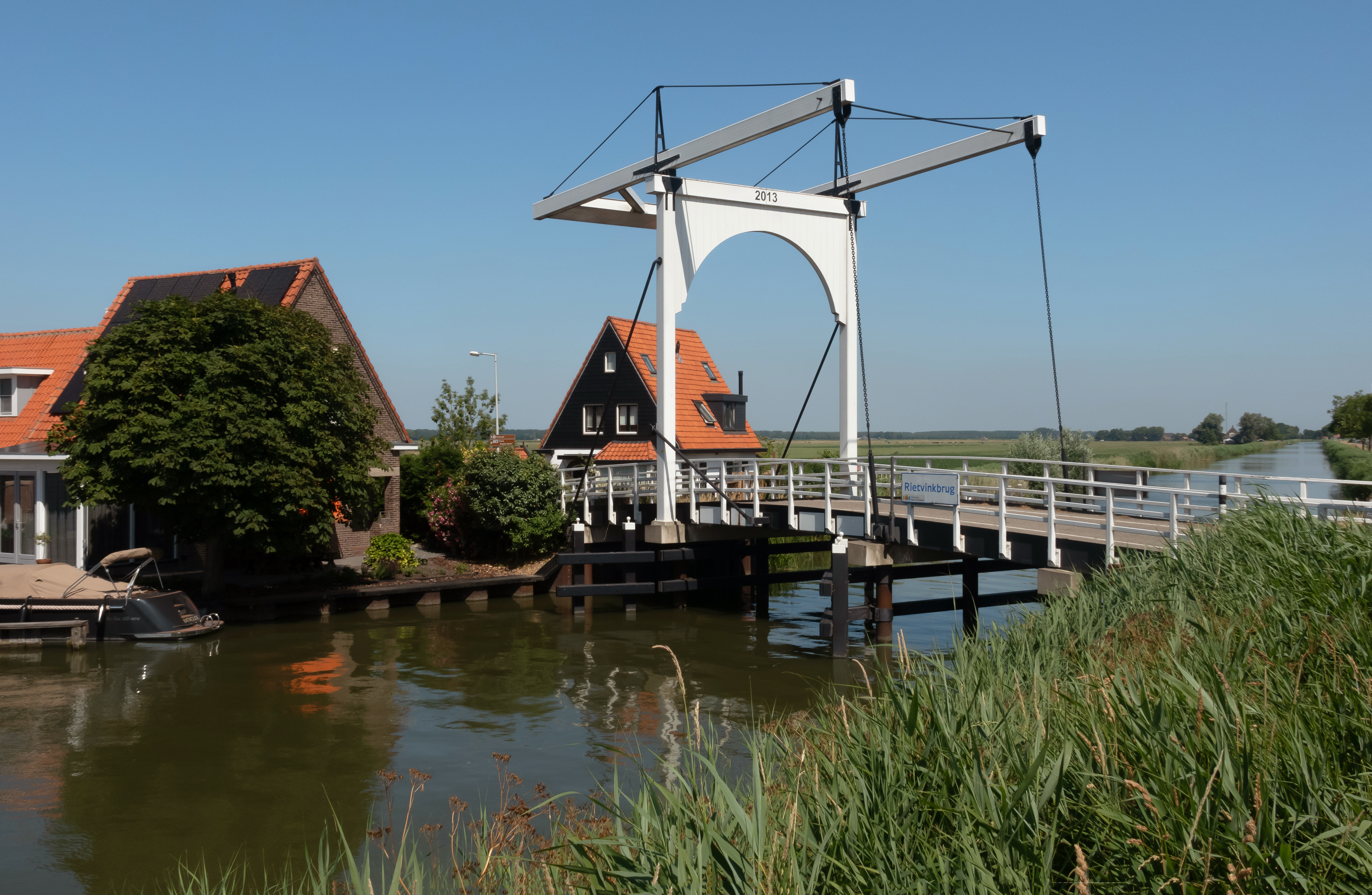
Drawbridge: the Rietvinkbrug

== See also ==
- Museum de Speeltoren
