= Koker trilogy =

Series of films directed by Abbas Kiarostami

Koker shown next to the Caspian Sea.

The Koker trilogy is a series of three films directed by acclaimed Iranian film-maker Abbas Kiarostami: Where Is the Friend's House? (1987), Life, and Nothing More... (a.k.a. And Life Goes On, 1992) and Through the Olive Trees (1994). The designation was made by film theorists and critics, rather than by Kiarostami himself, who resists the designation and notes that the films are connected only by the accident of place (referring to the fact that Koker is the name of a northern Iranian village). He has suggested that it might be more appropriate to consider the latter two titles plus Taste of Cherry (1997) as a trilogy, since these are connected by the theme of life's preciousness.

== Plot ==
Where Is the Friend's House? depicts the simple story of a young boy who travels from Koker to a neighbouring village to return the notebook of a schoolmate.

And Life Goes On follows a father and his young son as they drive from Tehran to Koker in search of the two young boys who had acted in Where Is the Friend's House?, fearing that the two might have perished in the 1990 Iran earthquake that killed 50,000 people in northern Iran.

Through the Olive Trees examines the making of a small scene from And Life Goes On, forcing the viewer to witness a peripheral drama from Life as the central drama in Olive.

== Analysis ==
Kiarostami's three films are poised between fiction and real life, opening the medium to new formal experiences. They are among his most acclaimed work.

Adrian Martin emphasises Kiarostami's direct perception of the world and identifies his cinema as being "diagrammatical". Literal "diagrams" inscribed in the landscape, such as the famous zigzagging pathway in the "Koker Trilogy", indicate a "geometry of forces of life and of the world". For Martin, these forces are neither complete order, nor complete chaos but rather what lies between these poles.

The village is left to its own devices after the earthquake and has gone through a lot of change in the last three decades. However, it is still considered an attraction for film lovers and cineastes all around the world.

== See also ==
- Cinema of Iran
