= List of awards won by Abbas Kiarostami =

Awards won by Iranian actor

Iranian film director Abbas Kiarostami won the admiration of audiences and critics worldwide and received more than 70 awards in his career. These awards are listed below:

- Jury Special Award for The Bread and Alley at the 5th Tehran International Festival of Films for Children and Young Adults, Iran 1970
- First Prize in Narrative Category for The Experience at the 4th Giffoni International Film Festival, Italy 1974
- Jury's Grand Prize for The Traveler at the 9th Tehran International Festival of Films for Children and Young Adults, Iran 1974
- National TV Prize for The Traveler at the 9th Tehran International Festival of Films for Children and Young Adults, Iran 1974
- Special Diploma of Critics for A Wedding Suit at the 11th Tehran International Festival of Films for the Children and Young Adults, Iran 1976
- First Prize for Two Solutions for One Problem at the International Educational Festival of Mexico, 1976
- Diploma of Honor for A Wedding Suit at the 10th Moscow International Film Festival, Soviet Union 1977
- Best Film Award for Case No. 1, Case No. 2 at the Iranian Festival of Films for Children and Young Adults, 1979
- Golden Plaque of Best Short Film for The Chorus at the 2nd Fajr International Film Festival, Tehran 1984
- Jury Special Award for First Graders at the 4th Fajr International Film Festival, Tehran 1986
- Golden Plaque of Best Director for Where Is the Friend's Home? at the 5th Fajr International Film Festival, Tehran 1987
- Jury Special Award for Where Is the Friend's Home? at the 5th Fajr International Film Festival, Tehran 1987
- Bronze Leopard for Where Is the Friend's Home? at the 42nd Locarno International Film Festival, Switzerland 1989
- FIPRESCI Special Mention for Where Is the Friend's Home? at the 42nd Locarno International Film Festival, Switzerland 1989
- Prize of International Confederation of Art Cinemas for Where Is the Friend's Home? at the 42nd Locarno International Film Festival, Switzerland 1989
- Ecumenical Jury's Special Mention for Where Is the Friend's Home? at the 42nd Locarno International Film Festival, Switzerland 1989
- Barclay Jury Prize for Where Is the Friend's Home? at the 42nd Locarno International Film Festival, Switzerland 1989
- Prize of International Confederation of Art Cinemas for Where Is the Friend's Home? at RCC, France, 1989
- Jury Special Prize for Close-Up at the 8th Fajr International Film Festival, Tehran 1990
- Silver R for Close-Up at the 3rd Rimini International Film Festival, Italy 1990
- Best Film Award for Where Is the Friend's Home? at the International Film Festival of the Royal Film Archive of Belgium, 1990
- Prize of Quebec Critics Association for Close-Up at the 19th Montreal International Festival of New Cinema & Video, Canada 1990
- Prize of Best Director for Close-Up at the 5th Dunkerque International Film Festival, France 1991
- Press Prize for Close-Up at the 5th Dunkerque International Film Festival, France 1991
- Prize of the City of Dunkerque for Close-Up at the 5th Dunkerque International Film Festival, France 1991
- Film Students Prize for Close-Up at the 5th Dunkerque International Film Festival, France 1991
- CINEKID Award for Where is the Friend's House? at the 5th Cinekid International Children Film Festival of Amsterdam, The Netherlands 1992
- FIPRESCI Prize for Close-Up at the 11th Istanbul International Film Festival, Turkey 1992
- Prix Roberto Rossellini Award for the Film Career of Abbas Kiarostami at the 45th Cannes International Film Festival, France 1992
- Best Film Award of Un Certain Regard for And Life Goes On at the 45th Cannes International Film Festival. France 1992
- Prix Cine Decouvertes for And Life Goes On from the Association of Belgian Film Distributors, 1992
- François Truffaut Award for Film Career of Abbas Kiarostami at the 23rd Giffoni International Film Festival, Italy 1993
- Prize of City of Rimini for Film Career of Abbas Kiarostami at the 6th Rimini International Film Festival, Italy 1993
- Special award of festival for Film career of Abbas Kiarostami at the 6th Rimini International Film Festival, Italy 1993
- Special Award of Critics for And Life Goes On at the 17th São Paulo International Film Festival, Brazil 1993
- Golden Spike for Film Career of Abbas Kiarostami at the 38th Valladolid International Film Festival, Spain 1993
- Silver Hugo for Through the Olive Trees at the 30th Chicago International Film festival, USA 1994
- Golden Spike for Through the Olive Trees at the 39th Valladolid International Film Festival, Spain 1994
- Special award of Critics for Through the Olive Trees at the 18th São Paulo International Film Festival, Brazil 1994
- Award of Best Director for Through the Olive Trees at the 8th Singapore International Film Festival, 1995
- Golden Rose Award of Best Film for Through the Olive Trees at the 13th Bergamo Film Meeting, Italy 1995
- Best Film Award for Where Is the Friend's Home? at the Rome Summer Film Festival, Italy 1995
- The Third Best Audience Film Prize for Through the Olive Trees at the 44th Melbourne International Film Festival, Australia 1995
- Pier Paolo Pasolini Award for Film Career of Abbas Kiarostami from Pier Paolo Pasolini Foundation, Rome 1995
- Director of the Year, the Variety International Film Guide, 1996
- Officier de la Légion d'honneur from Ministry of Culture and Art of France, 1996
- Palme d'Or for Best Film for Taste of Cherry at the 50th Cannes International Film Festival, France 1997
- Special award of Feast of Cinema for Abbas Kiarostami at the 2nd Feast of Cinema, Tehran 1997
- Special Prize of Festival for Film Career of Abbas Kiarostami at the 27th Giffoni International Film Festival, Italy 1997
- Vittorio De Sica Memorial Award for Film Career of Abbas Kiarostami from Vittorio De Sica Foundation, Italy 1997
- Federico Fellini Gold Medal (UNESCO Special award for Film Career of Abbas Kiarostami from UNESCO, France 1997)
- Taste of Cherry selected as the Best Film of the Year by Time magazine in 1997
- Taste of Cherry selected as the Best Foreign Film of the Year by Society of Film Critics of Boston, USA 1998
- Taste of Cherry selected as the Best Foreign Film of the Year by the National Society of Film Critics, USA 1998
- Special Prize of Masters for Abbas Kiarostami at the 18th Istanbul International Film Festival, Turkey 1999
- Jury Special Prize for The Wind Will Carry Us at the 56th Venice International Film Festival, Italy 1999
- FIPRESCI Award for The Wind Will Carry Us at the 56th Venice International Film Festival, Italy 1999
- The Youth Prize of Future Cinema for The Wind Will Carry Us at the 56th Venice International Film Festival, Italy 1999
- Golden Plaque of Panorama of European Cinema for Film Career of Abbas Kiarostami, Athens, Greece 1999
- Special Prize for Film career of Abbas Kiarostami at the 21st Montpellier International Mediterranean Film Festival, France 1999
- Honorary Golden Alexander Prize for Film Career of Abbas Kiarostami at the 40th Thessaloniki International Film Festival, Greece 1999
- Selected as the Most Outstanding Filmmaker of '90s at the Polling of Cinematheque Ontario, Canada 2000
- Honorary Prize of the 18th Fajr International Film festival for Film Career of Abbas Kiarostami, Tehran, Iran 2000
- The Best Filmmaker of '90s, Film Comment Poll, USA 2000
- Plaque of First Human Rights Declaration of the University of California at Berkeley, USA 2000
- The Golden Dolphin of Kish Island for Lifetime Achievement in Cinema, Iran 2000
- Akira Kurosawa Honorary Award of the 43rd San Francisco International Film Festival, USA 2000
- Special Plaque of Lebanese Ministry of Culture and Art, Lebanon 2000
- Lifetime Achievement for Abbas Kiarostami at the 3rd Beirut Film Festival, Lebanon 2000
- Political Cinema Award of Recanati, Italy 2000
- Honorary doctorate, École Normale Supérieure, 2003
- Konrad Wolf Prize, 2003
- Praemium Imperiale, 2004
- President of the Jury for Caméra d'Or Award, Cannes Festival 2005
- Fellowship of the British Film Institute, 2005
- Gold Leopard of Honor, Locarno film festival, 2005
- Prix Henri-Langlois Prize, 2006
- World's Great Masters, Kolkata International Film Festival, 2007
- Glory to the Filmmaker Award, Venice Film Festival, 2008
- Cup of Jamshid Award, 2008
- Espiga de Oro Largometraje for Certified Copy, Seminci, 2010
