= List of Iranian films of the 1970s =

A list of films produced in Iran ordered by year of release in the 1970s. For an alphabetical list of Iranian films see Category:Iranian films

== 1970s ==
Year	Title	Director	Actors	Genre	Notability
1970	The Bread and Alley	Abbas Kiarostami		Short	
1970	The Invincible Six	Jean Negulesco	Stuart Whitman, Elke Sommer, Behrouz Vossoughi	Adventure	Iranian-American co-production
1970	Malkoçoğlu Cem Sultan	Remzi Jöntürk, Hasan Sasanpour	Cüneyt Arkın, Pouri Banayi, Cihangir Ghaffari	Adventure, Historical	Iranian-Turkish co-production film
1970	The Nameless Knight	Halit Refiğ, Hasan Sasanpour	Cüneyt Arkın, Pouri Banayi	Historical, Fantasy	Iranian-Turkish co-production
1970	Mive-ye gonah	Mahmoud Koushan	Cüneyt Arkın, Shahin Khalili, Cihangir Ghaffari	Romance, Drama	Turkish-Iranian co-production film
1971	Mr. Naive	Dariush Mehrjui			Entered into the 7th Moscow International Film Festival
1971	Khodahafez Rafigh				
1971	İki Esir	Esmail Koushan, Natuk Baytan	Cüneyt Arkın, Filiz Akın, Homayoun Tabrizyan	Historical, Adventure, Fantasy, Comedy	Iranian-Turkish co-production
1971	Subah-o-Shaam / Homaye saadet	Tapi Chanakya	Mohammad Ali Fardin, Waheeda Rehman, Sanjeev Kumar	Romance, Drama	Iranian-Indian co-production
1971	Malkoçoğlu Ölüm Fedaileri	Remzi Jöntürk, Ebrahim Bagheri	Cüneyt Arkın, Lili Salimi, Talat Hussain, Kamyab Kasravi	Historical adventure	Turkish-Iranian-Pakistani co-production film
1971	Sattar Khan				
1972	Breaktime	Abbas Kiarostami		Drama / Short	
1972	An Isfahani in New York	Shaollah Nazerian	Nosratollah Vahdat, Reza Arham Sadr, Annie Gagen	Comedy drama	
1973	The Experience	Abbas Kiarostami		Short feature	
1973	Golgo 13	Junya Sato	Ken Takakura, Pouri Banayi	Action	Iranian-Japaneze co-production
1974	The Traveller	Abbas Kiarostami		Drama	
1974	Gavaznha	Masoud Kimiai		Drama	
1974	Hamsafar	Masoud Asadollah	Googoosh, Behrouz Vossoughi	Romantic drama	
1974	International Crook	Pachhi		Action	Iranian-Indian co-production
1974	Still Life	Sohrab Shahid-Saless		Drama	Won the Silver Bear at Berlin
1974	The Traveler	Abbas Kiarostami		Drama	
1975	Dayereh Mina	Dariush Mehrjui		Drama	Submitted to the 50th Academy Awards
1975	Far from Home	Sohrab Shahid-Saless		Drama	Entered into the 25th Berlin International Film Festival
1975	So Can I	Abbas Kiarostami		Short	
1976	Colors	Abbas Kiarostami		Short	
1976	Chess of the Wind	Mohammad Reza Aslani			
1976	A Wedding Suit	Abbas Kiarostami		Short feature	
1977	Gozaresh	Abbas Kiarostami	Shohreh Aghdashloo	Drama	Abbas Kiarostami's first feature film
1977	How to Make Use of Leisure Time: Painting	Abbas Kiarostami		Short	
1977	Tribute to the Teachers	Abbas Kiarostami		Short	
1977	Dead End	Parviz Sayyad	Mary Apik		Entered into the 10th Moscow International Film Festival
1978	Solution	Abbas Kiarostami		Short	
1978	Dar Emtedad-e Shab	Parviz Sayyad	Googoosh, Saeed Kangarani	Romance, Drama	
1978	Acı Hatıralar	Atıf Yılmaz, Iraj Ghaderi	Emel Sayın, Iraj Ghaderi	Romantic drama, musical, crime	Turkish-Iranian co-production film
1979	First Case, Second Case	Abbas Kiarostami		Short feature	
1979	Ballad of Tara	Bahram Bayzai			Entered into the 1980 Cannes Film Festival
