= Cinematic style of Abbas Kiarostami =

Style of the Iranian film director

The Iranian film director Abbas Kiarostami is known for uses of certain themes and cinematic techniques that are instantly recognizable in his work, from the use of child protagonists and stories that take place in rural villages, to conversations that unfold inside cars utilizing stationary mounted cameras. He often undertook a documentary style of filmmaking within narrative works, and frequently employs contemporary Iranian poetry in dialogue, movie titles, and in the thematic elements of his pictures.

== The Kiarostamian style ==
Though Abbas Kiarostami has been compared to Satyajit Ray, Vittorio de Sica, Eric Rohmer, and Jacques Tati, his films exhibit a singular style, often employing techniques of his own invention (the so-called "Kiarostamian style").

During the filming of The Bread and Alley, his first film, Kiarostami disagreed with his experienced cinematographer about how to film the boy and the attacking dog. The cinematographer wanted separate shots of the boy approaching, a close up of his hand as he enters the house and closes the door, followed by a shot of the dog. Kiarostami believed that if the three scenes could be captured as a whole it would have a more profound impact, creating tension. That one shot took some forty days to complete. Kiarostami later commented that the breaking of scenes can disrupt the rhythm and content of the film's structure, stating he prefers to let the scene flow as one.

Unlike other directors he showed no interest in developing his directorial muscles by staging extravagant combat scenes or complicated chase scenes in large-scale productions. Instead, he attempted to use the medium of film in his own unique way. As he quoted in relation to his cinematographer's perspective on filming: "I did not follow the conventions of film making that he had become accustomed to".

Kiarostami appeared to have settled on his style when he made the Koker trilogy. Nevertheless, he continued experimenting with new modes of filming, using different directorial methods. Much of Ten, for example, was filmed in a moving automobile without Kiarostami present. He gave suggestions to the actors about what to do, and a camera placed on the dashboard then filmed them while they drove around Tehran. The camera was allowed to roll, capturing the faces of the people during their daily routine, using a series of extreme close-up shots.

Kiarostami's cinema offers a different definition of film. According to film professors such as Jamsheed Akrami, unlike many other contemporary filmmakers Kiarostami has consistently attempted to redefine film by forcing the audience's increased involvement. In recent years he has also progressively trimmed down the size of his films, which Akrami believes reduces the film making experience from a collective endeavor to a purer, more basic form of artistic expression.

As Kiarostami quoted in relation to his individual style of minimalism:

My films have been progressing towards a certain kind of minimalism, even though it was never intended. Elements that can be eliminated have been eliminated. This was pointed out to me by somebody who referred to the paintings of Rembrandt and his use of light: some elements are highlighted while others are obscured or even pushed back into the dark. And it's something that we do – we bring out elements that we want to emphasise.

Self-referencing is a feature specific to Kiarostami's cinema. Stephen Bransford contends that Kiarostami's films do not contain references to the work of other directors, but do include a myriad of references to his own work. Bransford believes his films are often fashioned into an ongoing dialectic: one film reflecting on and partially demystifying an earlier film.

== Fiction and non-fiction ==
Kiarostami's films contain a notable degree of ambiguity, an unusual mixture of simplicity and complexity, and often mix fiction and documentary elements. As Kiarostami has said, "We can never get close to the truth except through lying."

Kiarostami has said of his film making: "An artist designs and creates a piece hoping to materialize some thoughts, concepts or feelings through his or her medium. The credibility of great Persian poets like Rumi and Hafez comes from the very fact that they are composed in such a way that they are fresh and meaningful regardless of the time, place and conditions in which you read them—and this means reading them while doing divination or simply as literature."

The boundary between fiction and non-fiction is significantly reduced in Kiarostami's cinema. The French philosopher Jean-Luc Nancy, writing about Kiarostami, and in particular Life, and Nothing More..., has argued that his films are neither quite fiction nor quite documentary. Life and Nothing More..., he argues, is neither representation nor reportage, but rather "evidence":

[I]t all looks like reporting, but everything underscores (indique à l'évidence) that it is the fiction of a documentary (in fact, Kiarostami shot the film several months after the 1990 earthquake), and that it is rather a document about "fiction": not in the sense of imagining the unreal, but in the very specific and precise sense of the technique, of the art of constructing images. For the image by means of which, each time, each opens a world and precedes himself in it (s'y prédède) is not pregiven (donnée toute faite) (as are those of dreams, phantasms or bad films): it is to be invented, cut and edited. Thus it is evidence, insofar as, if one day I happen to look at my street on which I walk up and down ten times a day, I construct for an instant a new evidence of my street.

Close-Up, for example, contains scenes from the real-life trial of a man charged with fraudulently impersonating a film director. To make the film, however, Kiarostami coaxed the antagonists to re-stage scenes occurring between them, including the arrest. While such a technique clearly precludes labeling the film as a documentary, by re-staging events between the deceiver and the deceived Kiarostami implicitly poses questions about the validity and significance of what the audience sees. Because these are the actual participants in a drama played out in criminal court, it dawns on the audience that these re-stagings are also part of the real life of these people, especially since both the impersonator and the family he fooled were interested in working in cinema. If these re-enactments constitute a kind of "evidence", this is less because they show us what took place to cause the arrest than because the audience is witness to a scene in which the actors are in fact continuing the story of their confrontation and/or reconciliation.

For Jean-Luc Nancy, this notion of cinema as "evidence," rather than as documentary or imagination, is tied to the way Kiarostami deals with life and death:

Existence resists the indifference of life and death, it lives beyond mechanical "life," it is always its own mourning, and its own joy. It becomes figure, image. It does not become alienated in images, but it is presented there: the images are the evidence of its existence, the objectivity of its assertion. This thought—which, for me, is the very thought of this film [Life and Nothing More...]—is a difficult thought, perhaps the most difficult. It's a slow thought, always under way, fraying a path so that the path itself becomes thought. It is that which frays images so that images become this thought, so that they become the evidence of this thought—and not in order to "represent" it.

Wanting to do more than just represent life and death as an opposition, and instead to show the way in which each is inevitably and profoundly involved with the other, Kiarostami has devised a cinema that does more than just present the viewer with the documentable "facts," but neither is it simply a matter of artifice. Because "existence" means more than simply life, it is projective, containing an irreducibly fictive element, but in this "being more than" life, it is therefore contaminated by mortality. Nancy is giving an interpretation of Kiarostami's statement that lying is the only way to truth.

== Themes of life and death ==
Themes of life and death and the concepts of change and continuity play a major role in Kiarostami's works. In the Koker trilogy, for example, we see an ongoing life force in the face of death and destruction, and the power of human resilience to overcome and defy death. The film is set in the aftermath of the 1990 Tehran earthquake. Kiarostami expressed how important these themes are in his films, particularly in the film Life, and Nothing More..., directed soon after the disaster:

It is a very important film, Life, and Nothing More..., in that what was filmed was inspired by a journey I had made just three days after an earthquake. And I speak not only of the film itself but also of the experience of being in that place, where only three days before 50,000 people had died. For the survivors, it was as if they were reborn, having experienced death around them. The earthquake had happened at four or five in the morning, so in a sense everybody could have been dead and it was almost accidental that they hadn't died. So I didn't just see myself as a film director here, but also as an observer of people who had been condemned to death. So this was a very big influence on me, and the issue of life and death from then on does recur in my films.

The theme of suicide is also important in several of his earlier films. He shows how the desire to self-harm is often counteracted by humanity and the need to help others in the face of death. This illustrates the ongoing life force and the power of life over death.

Taste of Cherry explores the fragility of life and rhetorically focuses on the preciousness of life. Badii, a middle aged apparently healthy and well off Tehrani (played by Homayoun Ershadi), cruises the city's outskirts in his Range Rover trying to find a stranger who will help him commit suicide. Conversations with people on the way gradually convince him of the positivity and preciousness of life. From the young Kurdish soldier who is spooked by the shuddering request to a middle-aged Afghani seminarian who is unable to dissuade Badii with religious sympathy to a Turkish taxidermist at a natural history museum who urges the glories of nature — the taste of cherries — as the prime reason not to kill oneself, Kiarostami evokes a high degree of emphasis on the different elements of life.

When the protagonist reaches his grave, a black screen evokes his symbolic death, but the finality of this ending is undermined by the video sequences that follow, which show the actor playing Mr. Badiei lighting a cigarette and the film crew resting. Again, life goes on, but in an off-screen elsewhere.

Symbols of death proliferate throughout The Wind Will Carry Us with scenes set in a graveyard, the imminence of the old woman's passing, and the ancestors that the character of Farzad mentions in an early scene. Such devices ask the viewer to consider the parameters of the afterlife and the concept of immaterial existence. In the film's opening sequence, Behzad tells Farzad that like people, cars have ghosts. This becomes the theme of the work and the subject of the film — they are waiting for the old woman to give up the ghost. The viewer is asked to consider what constitutes the soul, and what happens to the soul after death. In discussing the film, Kiarostami stated that his function is that of one who raises questions, rather than answers them. Kiarostami affirms that the audience must decide for themselves.

Some film critics believe that the assemblage of light versus dark scenes in Kiarostami's film grammar in Taste of Cherry and The Wind Will Carry Us suggests the mutual existence of life with its endless possibilities and death as a factual moment of anyone's life. When the leading actor in The Wind Will Carry Us enters the dark he recites a poem by Forough Farrokhzad that represents his nostalgic yearning for light and life in a dark, dead moment:

If you happen to come to my house, oh dear, bring a lamp for me; and a window
so that I can watch the crowd in the happy street.

Regarding Kiarostami's ABC Africa made in Kampala in 2001 during the AIDS epidemic, Geoff Andrew stated that "like his previous four features, this film is not about death but life-and-death: how they're linked, and what attitude we might adopt with regard to their symbiotic inevitability..."

== Visual and audio techniques ==

Kiarostami's style is notable for the use of long shots, such as in the closing sequences of Life, and Nothing More... and Through the Olive Trees, where the audience is intentionally distanced physically from the characters to invite reflection on their fate. Taste of Cherry is punctuated throughout by shots of this kind, including distant overhead shots of the suicidal Badii's car moving across the hills, usually while he is in conversation with a passenger. The physical distancing techniques stand in juxtaposition to the dialogue, which always remains in the foreground. Like the coexistence of private and public space, or the frequent framing of landscapes through car windows, this fusion of distance with proximity has been seen as a way of generating suspense in the most mundane of moments.

This relationship between distance and intimacy, between imagery and sound, is also present in the opening sequence of The Wind Will Carry Us. From the outset, Kiarostami formulates a dialectical relationship between image and sound. The camera moves from long shots of the Land Rover winding its way through the mountain paths to extreme close-ups of the film's protagonist. Concurrently, Kiarostami aurally represents an expanse that extends far beyond what the viewer can see at any moment, even when the camera remains a considerable distance from the subject matter on-screen. Kiarostami establishes numerous spaces beyond the visual field by fragmenting his soundtrack to include other sounds such as birds singing, dogs barking and electronic devices such as cell phones and radios blaring in the distance. By referring to characters the viewer does not see or hear, Kiarostami widens the scope of his films.

Michael J. Anderson has argued that such a thematic application of presence without presence manipulates our perception of nature and space in the geographical framework in which the world is portrayed. Kiarostami's use of sound and imagery conveys a world beyond what is directly visible and/or audible, which Anderson believes emphasises the shrinking of time and space and the interconnectedness of the modern world.

Film critic Ben Zipper believes that Kiarostami's work as a landscape artist is evident in the composition of distant shots of the dry hills throughout a number of his films. He points out that Kiarostami's use of rural locations and remote settings is reminiscent of Sohrab Sepehri’s attention to landscape as represented in his poems such as Golestaneh, in which the poet treats the rural environment realistically and imbues it with a poetic aura.

== Poetry and imagery ==
Ahmad Karimi-Hakkak of the University of Maryland discusses how one aspect of Kiarostami's cinematic style is that he is able to capture essences of Persian poetry and create poetic imagery within the landscape of his films. In Where Is the Friend's Home? and The Wind Will Carry Us, classical Persian poetry is directly quoted in the film, highlighting the artistic link and intimate connection between them. This in turn reflects on the connection between the past and present, between continuity and change.

In 2003, Kiarostami directed Five, a poetic feature that contained no dialogue or characterisation whatsoever. The movie consists of five single-take long shots of the natural landscape along the shores of the Caspian Sea. Although the film lacks a clear storyline, Geoff Andrew argues that the film is "more than just pretty pictures": "assembled in order, they comprise a kind of abstract or emotional narrative arc, which moves evocatively from separation and solitude to community, from motion to rest, near-silence to sound and song, light to darkness and back to light again, ending on a note of rebirth and regeneration."

He notes the degree of artifice concealed behind the apparent simplicity of the imagery as everyday moments are captured. A piece of driftwood is tossed and broken by the waves; people stroll along the promenade; a group of dogs gather by the water's edge whilst ducks strut across the frame. A pool of water is shot at night with the sounds of a storm, and frogs croaking break the stillness.

An aspect of Abbas Kiarostami's artistry that eludes those unfamiliar with Persian poetry and that has therefore remained inaccessible to many is the way he turns poetic images into cinematic ones. This is most obvious in those Kiarostami films that recall specific texts of Persian poetry more or less explicitly (including in their titles): Where's the Friend's Home? and The Wind will Carry Us. The characters recite poems mainly from classical Persian poet Omar Khayyám or modern Persian poets Sohrab Sepehri and Forough Farrokhzad. One of the most poetic moments in Wind Will Carry Us is a long shot of a wheat field with rippling golden crops through which the doctor, accompanied by the filmmaker, is riding his scooter down a twisting road. In response to his comment that the other world is a better place than this one, the doctor recites this poem of Khayyam:

They promise of houris in heaven
But I would say wine is better
Take the present to the promises
A drum sounds melodious from afar

However, the aesthetic involved with the poetry goes much farther back in time and is used much more subtly than these examples suggest. Beyond issues of adaptation of text to film, Kiarostami often begins with an insistent will to give visual embodiment to certain specific image-making techniques in Persian poetry, both classical and contemporary, and often ends up enunciating a larger philosophical position, namely the ontological oneness of poetry and film.

Sima Daad from the Department of Comparative Literature at the University of Washington feels that the creative merit of Kiarostami's adaptation of Sohrab Sepehri and Forough Farrokhzad's poems extends the domain of textual transformation. Adaptation is defined as the transformation of a prior text to a new text. Kiarostami's adaptation arrives at theoretical realm of adaptation by expanding its limit from inter-textual potential to trans-generic potential.

== Spirituality ==
Kiarostami's complex sound-images and philosophical approach have caused frequent comparisons with mystical filmmakers such as Andrei Tarkovsky and Robert Bresson. Irrespective of substantial cultural differences, much of western writing about Kiarostami positions him as the Iranian equivalent of such directors, by virtue of universal austere, spiritual poetics and moral commitment. Some draw parallels between certain imagery in Kiarostami's films with that of Sufi concepts.

Kiarostami's films often reflect upon immaterial concepts such as the soul and afterlife. At times, however, the very concept of the spiritual seems to be contradicted by the medium itself, given that it has no inherent means to confer the metaphysical. Some film theorists have argued that The Wind Will Carry Us provides a template by which a filmmaker can communicate metaphysical reality. The limits of the frame and the representation through dialogue with another that is not represented, physically become metaphors for the relationship between this world and those that may exist apart from it. By limiting the space of the mise en scène, Kiarostami expands the space of the art.

Asked in a 2000 Film Comment interview if there are any other directors who might be working on a "similar wavelength", Kiarostami pointed to Hou Hsiao-hsien as one. He said,

"Tarkovsky's works separate me completely from physical life, and are the most spiritual films I have seen — what Fellini did in parts of his movies, bringing dream life into film, he does as well. Theo Angelopoulos' movies also find this type of spirituality at certain moments. In general, I think movies and art should take us away from daily life, should take us to another state, even though daily life is where this flight is launched from."

Differing viewpoints have arisen in this debate. While the vast majority of English-language writers, such as David Sterritt and Spanish film professor Alberto Elena, interpret these films as spiritual films, critics including David Walsh and Hamish Ford disagree.

== Kiarostami and digital micro cinema ==
At the turn of the 21st century, Kiarostami decided to change from 35 mm film production to digital video. The first film where he used this technology was ABC Africa, which was compiled from footage shot with two small digital video cameras, material originally gathered for the purposes of research and scouting. Referring to digital cinema Kiarostami said: "Digital video is within the reach of anybody, like a ballpoint pen. I'd even dare to predict that within the next decade, we'll see a burst of interest in film-making as a consequence of the impact of video". Kiarostami stated about the documentary ABC Africa that "directing was spontaneously and unconsciously eliminated, by which I mean artificial and conventional directing."

Abbas Kiarostami's film Ten (2002) was an experiment that used digital cameras to virtually eliminate the director. Kiarostami fastened cameras to the dashboard of a car, and then allowed his actors to act. There was no film crew in the car, and no director. There is no camera movement, other than the movement of the car which carries the camera. There is minimal cutting and editing. This new direction is towards a digital micro cinema, defined as micro-budget filmmaking allied with digital production.

Modularity, Repetition and Variation in "Ten (2000)"

According to filmmaker Matthew Clayfield, Kiarostami's work with digital video may be more valuable to cinema than it is to post-cinema, but it also proves that virtually anyone with a camera can contribute to the art form in ways that were previously impossible. In 2005, Kiarostami directed a workshop on digital film-making at the London Film School, in which he expressed reservations about digital cinema. "My film 10 is a couple of years old now," explains Kiarostami to film students, "and today I'm not so fascinated by digital technology. [...] recently it has become clear to me just how few people actually know how to use it properly."

He also stated: "I have somewhat lost my enthusiasm [for digital video] in the last four or five years. Mainly because film students using digital video these days have not really produced anything more than superficial or simplistic; so I have my doubts. Despite the great advantages of digital video and the great ease of using the medium, still those who use it have first to understand the sensitivities of how to best use the medium."

== See also ==
- Film genre
- Abbas Kiarostami filmography
- French New Wave
- Iranian New Wave
- Italian neorealism

== Secondary literature ==
Books:

- Víctor Erice; Abbas Kiarostami (2006). Erice—Kiarostami: correspondences. Centre de Cultura Contemporània de Barcelona. ISBN 84-96540-24-3.
- Alberto Elena; Iran Heritage Foundation (2005). The cinema of Abbas Kiarostami. Saqi Books. ISBN 978-0-86356-594-6.
- Saeed-Vafa, Mehrnaz (2003). Abbas Kiarostami. University of Illinois Press. ISBN 978-0-252-07111-9.
- Rice, Julian (2020). Abbas Kiarostami's Cinema of Life. Rowman & Littlefield. ISBN 978-1-5381-3700-0
- Nancy, Jean-Luc (2001). بداهت فیلم: عباس کیارستمی. ISBN 978-2-930128-17-7.
- Bernardet, Jean-Claude (2004). Caminhos de Kiarostami. ISBN 978-85-359-0571-7.
- Marco Dalla Gassa (2000). Abbas Kiarostami. Le Mani-Microart'S. ISBN 978-88-8012-147-3.
- Ishaghpour, Youssef (2000). Le réel, face et pile: Le cinéma d'Abbas Kiarostami. Editions Farrago. ISBN 978-2-84490-063-0.
- Barbera, Alberto; Resegotti, Elisa (2003). Kiarostami. Mondadori Electa. ISBN 978-88-370-2390-4.
- Žižek, Slavoj (2006). Lacan: The Silent Partners. Verso. ISBN 978-1-84467-549-4.

Articles:

- Cheshire, Godfrey, "Confessions of a Sin-ephile: Close-Up" Cinema Scope (Toronto), Winter 2000, issue 2, pp. 3–8
- Cheshire, Godfrey, "The Short Films of Abbas Kiarostami," Cinematexas 5 (film festival catalog, October 16–22, 2000, Austin Texas), pp. 154–159
- Doraiswamy, Rashmi, "Abbas Kiarostami: Life and Much More" (interview), Cinemaya: The Asian Film Quarterly, Summer 1999, pp. 18–20
- Ghoukasian, Zavin, ed., Majmou-e-ye Maghalat dar Naghd-e va Moarrefi Asar-e Abbas Kiarostami ("A Collection of Articles on Criticizing and Introducing the Work of Abbas Kiarostami"), Tehran: Nashr-e Didar, 1375 [1996] (In Persian)
- Haghighat, Mamad, with the collaboration of Frédéric Sabouraud, Histoire du Cinéma Iranian, 1900–1999, Paris: Centre Georges Pompidou/Bibliothèque publique d’information (Cinéma du réel), 1999 (In French)
- Hampton, Howard, "Lynch Mob," Artforum, January 2000 (See also letters from Kent Jones and Jonathan Rosenbaum and responses from Hampton in the March 2000 issue of Artforum)
- Ishaghpour, Youssef, Le réel, face et pile: Le cinéma d’Abbas Kiarostami, Tours: Farrago, 2000 (In French)
- Jones, Kent, "The Wind Will Carry Us", Film Comment, Volume 36, No. 2, (March–April 2000), pp. 72–3
- Karimi, Iraj, Abbas Kiarostami, Filmsaz-e Realist ("Abbas Kiarostami: The Realistic Filmmaker"), Tehran: Nashr-e Ahoo, 1365 [1987] (In Persian) Kiarostami, Abbas: Textes, enretiens, filmographie complète, Paris: Petit Bibliothèque des Cahiers du Cinéma, 1997 (In French)
- Kiarostami, Abbas, "Le Goût de la Cerise" (cutting continuity of Taste Of Cherry), L’Avant-Scène Cinéma no. 471, April 1998
- Kiarostami, Abbas, "Le monde d'A.K.," Cahiers du Cinéma no. 493.(in French)
- Kiarostami, Abbas, Photographies, Photographs, Fotografie ..., Paris: Editions Hazan, 1999 (trilingual book in French, English, and Italian; includes interview with Kiarostami by Michel Ciment and short biographical sketch)
- Kretzschmar, Laurent "Is Cinema Renewing Itself?", Film-Philosophy. vol. 6 no. 15, July 2002.
- Naficy, Hamid, An Accented Cinema: Exilic and Diasporic Filmmaking, Princeton/ Oxford: Princeton University Press, 2001
- Nancy, Jean-Luc and Kiarostami, Abbas, L’Evidence du film/The Evidence of Film (trilingual text in French, English, and Persian), Bruxelles: Yves Gevaert Editeur, 2001
- Nakjavani, Erik, “Between the Dark Earth and the Sheltering Sky: The Arboreal in Kiarostami’s Photography” IRANIAN STUDIES, March 2006 (Vol.39, No.1)
- Over, William, "Worlds Transformed: Iranian Cinema and Social Vision" Contemporary Justice Review, Volume 9, Number 1, Number 1/March 2006, pp. 67–80(14)
- Perez, Gilberto, "History Lessons," The Material Ghost: Films and Their Medium, Baltimore and London: The Johns Hopkins University Press, 1998
- Piroposhteh, Mohammed Shabani, ed., Tarhi Az Doust: Negahi be Zendegi va Asar-e Filmsaz-e Andishmand Abbas Kiarostami ("A Design of a Friend"), Tehran: Entesharat-e Rozaneh, 1376 [1997] (In Persian)
- Rosenbaum, Jonathan, "The Death of Hulot," Placing Movies: The Practice of Film Criticism, Berkeley/Los Angeles: University of California Press, pp. 163–179. See also "Tati's Democracy," Movies as Politics, Berkeley/Los Angeles: University of California Press, 1997, pp. 37–40
- Rosenbaum, Jonathan, "Lessons from a Master," Chicago Reader, June 14, 1996 (Other early Chicago Reader articles on Kiarostami: October 23, 1992 and September 29, 1995)
- Rosenbaum, Jonathan, "Short and Sweet", Film Comment, Volume 36, No. 4, (July/August 2000), p 27
- Rosenbaum, Jonathan, "Life and Nothing More – Abbas Kiarostami's African Musical", Film Comment, vol. 37 no. 5, Sept/Oct 2001, pp. 20–21
- Saeed-Vafa, Mehrnaz, "Sohrab Shahid Saless: A Cinema of Exile," Life and Art: The New Iranian Cinema, edited by Rose Issa and Sheila Whitaker, London: National Film Theatre (British Film Institute), 1999, pp. 135–144
- Sterritt, David, "With Borrowed Eyes", Film Comment, Volume 36, No. 4, (July–August 2000), pp 20–26
- Shilina-Conte, Tanya, “Abbas Kiarostami’s ‘Lessons of Darkness:’ Affect, Non-Representation, and Becoming-Imperceptible.” Iran Namag, A Quarterly of Iranian Studies 2, no. 4 (Winter 2018). University of Toronto, Canada.
