= List of Iranian films of the 1980s =

A list of films produced in Iran ordered by year of release in the 1980s. For an alphabetical list of Iranian films see Category:Iranian films

== 1980s ==
Year	Title	Director	Actors	Genre	Notability
1980	Toothache	Abbas Kiarostami		Short	
1981	Orderly or Disorderly	Abbas Kiarostami		Short	
1982	The Chorus	Abbas Kiarostami		Short	
1982	Hajji Washington	Ali Hatami	Ezzatollah Entezami	Drama / Comedy	Released in 1998
1983	Fellow Citizen	Abbas Kiarostami		Documentary	
1983	Ferestadeh	Parviz Sayyad			Entered into the 33rd Berlin International Film Festival
1984	Kamalolmolk	Ali Hatami	Ezzatollah Entezami, Jamshid Mashayekhi	Biography/Drama	
1984	First Graders	Abbas Kiarostami		Documentary	
1984	Eagles	Samuel Khachikian		War, Action	
1985	Boycott	Mohsen Makhmalbaf	Majid Majidi	Political drama	
1985	Davandeh	Amir Naderi		Drama	The first post-revolution Iranian film to attract worldwide attention Won Golden Montgolfiere at Nantes Three Continents Festival
1985	Jadehay sard	Massood Jafari Jozani		Drama	Screened at the 37th Berlin International Film Festival
1985	Jafar Khan Is Back from the West	Ali Hatami	Ezzatollah Entezami, Mohammad-Ali Keshavarz	Comedy-Drama	
1986	Bashu, the Little Stranger	Bahram Bayzai	Susan Taslimi	Drama	Banned till released in 1989
1987	The Cyclist	Mohsen Makhmalbaf		Drama	Won the Best Feature Film award at Hawaiian Film Festival
1987	Captain Khorshid	Nasser Taghvai	Dariush Arjmand, Ali Nassirian		
1987	Dastforoush (a/k/a "The Peddler," US)	Mohsen Makhmalbaf		Drama	
1987	Kelid	Ebrahim Forouzesh		Drama	Written by Abbas Kiarostami
1987	Where Is the Friend's Home?	Abbas Kiarostami		Drama	Won the Bronze Leopard at Locarno International Film Festival; The first part of Kiarostami's Earthquake trilogy
1988					
1989	Homework	Abbas Kiarostami		Documentary	
1989	The Marriage of the Blessed	Mohsen Makhmalbaf		Drama	
1989	Grand Cinema	Hassan Hedayat			Entered into the 16th Moscow International Film Festival
