= Toothache (film) =

- دندان‌ درد
- Directed by: Abbas Kiarostami
- Written by: Abbas Kiarostami
- Starring: Jamshid Parvizian
- Cinematography: Firuz Malekzadeh
- Edited by: Abbas Kiarostami
- Production company: Kanoon
- Release dates: 1980 (Iran); 1995 (Switzerland)
- Running time: 26 minutes (24fps)
- Country: Iran
- Language: Persian

Toothache (Persian: دندان‌ درد, romanized: Dandan dard) is a 1980 Iranian short educational film written, directed and edited by Abbas Kiarostami. It is also known as Dental Hygiene (Persian: بهداشت دندان, romanized: Behdasht-e dandan) which has led to some confusion and resulted in the film being listed under the latter title as an additional entry in some online filmographies, e.g. on IMDb.

Shot on 16mm, Toothache is the tenth of the 12 pedagogical short movies that Kiarostami made at the film-making department of the Institute for the Intellectual Development of Children and Young Adults (Kanoon) between 1970 and 1982. The film, concerned with teaching children why they must care for their teeth and brush them regularly, "is certainly the longest, the most didactic in tone and the most highly structured of all Kiarostami's shorts." To illustrate its point, the film contains ten animated shots, handled by Abdollah Alimorad and Mehdi Samakar, showing, among other things, little green tooth trolls pickaxing holes in a number of teeth. Toothache is, however, not the first of Kiarostami's Kanoon films to use animation—that was So Can I (Persian: منم میتونم, romanized: Manam mitunam, 1975).

== Plot ==
Iran, October 1980. Young Mohammad-Reza Askari, whose father and grandfather both wear dentures, rarely finds time to brush his teeth as he often runs late in the morning. At school this makes him a bit of a pariah: shunned by his classmates due to his bad breath, unfit to participate in sports activities on account of his nascent toothache, eventually unable to attend school because the pain is now so excruciating that all he can do is whimper. He needs to go and get his teeth checked by a dentist at the local public dental clinic. While a dental surgeon works on Mohammad's teeth, the serious-faced chief dentist delivers a thirteen-minute direct-to-camera monologue on proper dental hygiene and explains how tooth decay occurs. His lecture is punctuated by brief animations, moving charts, a sequence showing how to brush one's teeth properly, off-camera screaming and moaning as well as shots of Mohammad suffering and being treated. Once the treatment is finished and the pain is gone, Mohammad is able to return to his daily activities which now include regular tooth brushing.

== Reception ==
In Iran the film "was apparently given an excellent reception and enjoyed quite a wide circulation." Since Kiarostami has gained international acclaim through his feature films, Toothache, which had its international premiere at Locarno in 1995, has been shown at numerous festivals throughout the world and has received scholarly attention from academics—who don't necessarily agree with Jonathan Rosenbaum's assessment of the movie as "a simple piece of didacticism about dental hygiene".

Hamid Dabashi, for instance, gives the film a deconstructive reading: "The narrative [...] rests on a typically Kiarostamiesque pondering on the relationship of constructed reality (dentures) to reality (teeth). Here the artistically re-created make-believe (dentures) is privileged over the naturally created reality (teeth)" because, after all, if the boy would have dentures his teeth wouldn't hurt. The film's message is thus double-edged, it paradoxically not only promotes dental care but also dental carelessness. Kiarostami would again take up this idea of the superiority of a "concocted reality [over] the real thing" in his last educational short, The Chorus (Persian: همسرایان, romanized: Hamsarayan, 1982), where the benefits of the old man's hearing aid mirror the convenience of the father and grandfather's dentures.

Approaching the film from a formalistic angle, Cahiers du cinéma's Laurent Roth is reminded of Georges Franju's Les poussières (1953) by "Kiarostami's unsparing depiction of the devastating effects of the scourge in question." For him, in contrast to Dabashi, it's not the opposition between the artificial and the organic but a hyperbolism, achieved through hyperrealism and evident in the film's "[h]umor and sadism[, that] manage[s] to slightly deflect this documentary from its hygienistic aim.

While Jim Knox of Senses of Cinema agrees with Elena that of all of Kiarostami's instructional shorts Toothache is—along Orderly or Disorderly (Persian: به ترتیب یا بدون ترتیب ؟, romanized: Be tartib ya bedun-e tartib?, 1981)—the one where "the pedagogical intention [...] is most starkly apparent", he, not unlike Dabashi and Roth, also points out "its refusal of generic conventions", although in his eyes the film's stance is an unambiguous affirmation of the virtues of caring for one's teeth which he interprets as an appeal to the Iranian public to care for their health because "[f]or a young revolutionary state, vehemently opposed to both global Blocs, the health of its citizens is one guarantee of combat effectiveness" (strangely enough, he fails to mention the First Gulf War which had broken out just one month prior to the time setting of the film's plot). In Dabashi, the diegetic world and the reality of post-revolutionary Iran exist merely side-by-side, whereas here they are put into relation. Knox thus continues, still in the vein of New Historicism, by opining that "[f]or a theocratic state, the issue assumes a metaphysical significance; the health of the individual derives from adherence to the discipline of a strict moral code", while he stresses at the same time that Toothache is "[p]erhaps surprisingly" the first of Kiarostami's shorts to feature women (albeit in minor roles).

== See also ==
- List of Iranian films
