= Roads of Kiarostami =

- Directed by: Abbas Kiarostami
- Written by: Abbas Kiarostami
- Release date: 2005
- Running time: 32 minutes
- Country: Iran
- Language: Persian

Roads of Kiarostami (Persian: جاده‌های کیارستمی) is a 2005 Iranian documentary film directed by Abbas Kiarostami.

== See also ==
- List of Iranian films
