= 24 Frames =

24 Frames may refer to:

- 24 Frames, a single from the Jason Isbell album, Something More Than Free
- 24 Frames (film), an Iranian film
