= Rang-ha =

The Colours
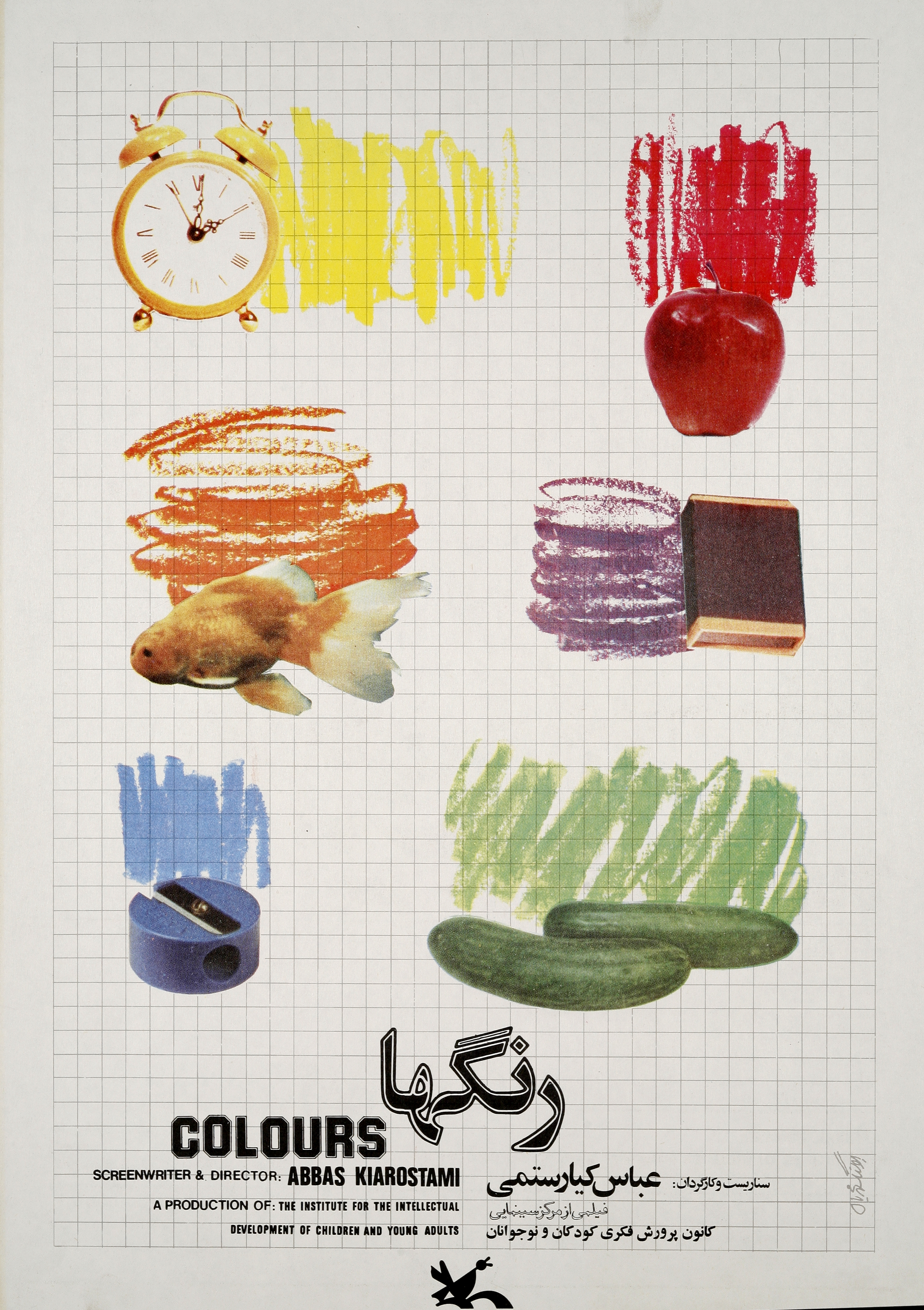
- Directed by: Abbas Kiarostami
- Written by: Abbas Kiarostami
- Release date: 1976 (Iran)
- Running time: 15 minutes
- Country: Iran
- Language: Persian

The Colours (Persian: ...رنگ‌ها, romanized: Rang-ha...) is a 1976 Iranian short film directed by Abbas Kiarostami.

== Content ==
By showing a series of different-coloured objects, the film aims to familiarize very young children with the various colours, and ends with a shot of a blackboard, a symbol of learning.

== See also ==
- List of Iranian films
