= Lessons with Kiarostami =

Book by Abbas Kiarostami

- First edition
- Editor: Paul Cronin
- Author: Abbas Kiarostami
- Original title: سرکلاس با کیارستمی
- Translator: Sohrab Mahdavi (English into Persian)
- Cover artist: Roshanak Mafi (Persian version, after a design by Paul Cronin)
- Language: English Persian Chinese Turkish
- Subject: Abbas Kiarostami Poetic Cinema of Kiarostami
- Genre: Culture Film
- Publisher: Sticking Place Books, Nazar Publication (Iran)
- Publication place: Iran United States Worldwide
- English publication date: October 1, 2015
- Pages: 190 (Paperback English version) 222 (Persian version)
- ISBN: 978-0990530800

Lessons with Kiarostami (Persian: سرکلاس با کیارستمی, transit. Sare Kelas ba Kiarostami) is a book written by Abbas Kiarostami, edited by Paul Cronin and with a foreword by acclaimed British director Mike Leigh. The book was published, simultaneously in English and Persian, shortly before Kiarostami's death. Drawn from Cronin's notes made at a series of workshops around the world, as led by Kiarostami, the text is written in the first person, from Kiarostami's point of view, and details his working methods and approach to poetic cinema. Lessons with Kiarostami was released alongside various volumes of English translations of Kiarostami's poetry, including In the Shadow of Trees. A Turkish translation and a Simplified Chinese translation of the book were published in 2017, and a Complex Chinese translation in 2018.

== Foreword ==
Writes Mike Leigh: "Here he is, one of the greatest of us all, the originator and master of the minimalist epic, the visionary who has raised the cinema of humanity to an unprecedented level of purity, the reluctant teacher who modestly confronts you with truths so profound that they will blind you with their luminous clairvoyance, the outrageous provocateur with an exhilarating capacity to make statements about his ideas and methods at which you will be so shocked that you will likely howl out loud, albeit joyfully."

== Reception ==
Writes Iranian film expert Godfrey Cheshire: "As someone who was fortunate enough to have known Abbas Kiarostami and had long conversations with him about film, I've often wished that other admirers of his work -- or just anyone who loves cinema -- had had the same opportunity to listen to him discourse at length on the art that he knew so well. Those who shared this captivating experience included students who attended the workshops he conducted around the world over the couple of decades prior to his untimely death in 2016. Writer-filmmaker Paul Cronin attended many of these sessions, recorded Kiarostami's words and has assembled them into a very cogently organized, book-length master class on the craft of filmmaking according to the Iranian auteur. These lessons are in many cases very practical in ways that could instruct any beginning filmmaker. But they also amount to a comprehensive philosophy of filmmaking that endlessly illuminates the work of one of cinema's greatest poetic humanists. A real treasure."

== See also ==
- Abbas Kiarostami: A Report
