= Homework (1989 film) =

1989 Iranian documentary film

- مشق شب
- Directed by: Abbas Kiarostami
- Written by: Abbas Kiarostami
- Produced by: Ali Reza Zarrin
- Starring: Pupils at Shahid Masumi School; Two pupils' fathers Abbas Kiarostami; Iraj Safavi
- Cinematography: Farhad Saba; Iraj Safavi; Ali Asghar Mirzai
- Edited by: Abbas Kiarostami
- Music by: Mohammad Reza Aligholi
- Production company: Kanoon
- Release date: 1989 (Iran)
- Running time: 86 minutes
- Country: Iran
- Language: Persian

Homework (Persian: مشق شب, romanized: Mašq-e šab) is a 1989 Iranian narrative documentary film written, directed and edited by Abbas Kiarostami.

The film was shot on 16mm in late January and/or early February 1988 at Tehran's Shahid Masumi primary school.

== Synopsis ==
The film consists almost exclusively of interviews with a number of pupils and two fathers of pupils at Shahid Masumi school who are asked to give their opinion on the traditional teaching practice of assigning homework. Issues such as some parents' illiteracy and their inability to help their children with the homework are raised. The children don't always succeed in hiding the more embarrassing aspects of their family life (corporal punishment, poverty, etc.).

== Release ==
Homework was included as a special feature in the Criterion Collection's release of the Koker trilogy.

== See also ==
- List of Iranian films

== Bibliography ==
- Deborah Young, "Mashgh-e shab (Homework)", Variety, no. 338, 7 March 1990, p. 32
- Peter Matthews, "A Little Learning", Sight & Sound, vol. 12, no. 6, June 2002, pp. 30–32
- Sonia Giardina, "Another Look at Homework by Abbas Kiarostami: An Investigation of a Pedagogic and Social Drama", Film International, no. 35, Summer 2002, p. 33
- François Niney, "Devoirs de maison", Cahiers du cinéma, no. 449, November 1991, pp. 62–63
- Danièle Parra, "Devoirs du soir", La Revue du cinéma, no. 477, December 1991, p. 41
- François Niney, "Devoirs de soir", Cahiers du cinéma, no. 493, July/August 1995, pp. 107–108
- Israel Diego Aragón, "Un documental de terror psicológico: Los deberes", in Letras de cine, no. 7, 2003, pp. 76–77
