= Two Solutions for One Problem =

- Directed by: Abbas Kiarostami
- Written by: Abbas Kiarostami
- Release date: 1975
- Running time: 4 min. 25 sec.
- Country: Iran
- Language: Persian

Two Solutions for One Problem (Persian: دو راه حل برای يک مسئله, Dow Rahehal Baraye yek Massaleh) is a 1975 Iranian short film directed by Abbas Kiarostami.

== Plot ==
During break time, Dara and Nader have a fierce argument about a torn exercise book that the former has given back to the latter. There are two possible outcomes, which the film shows one after the other. One is that Dara wants to get his own back, and the two boys start a violent fight; the other is that they work together to mend the exercise book with a little glue.

== See also ==
- List of Iranian films
