= Five (2003 film) =

Five Dedicated to Ozu
- Directed by: Abbas Kiarostami
- Written by: Abbas Kiarostami
- Release date: 2003
- Running time: 74 minutes
- Country: Iran
- Language: No dialogue

Five (Persian: پنج Panj), also known as Five Dedicated to Ozu, is a 2003 Iranian documentary film directed by Abbas Kiarostami. The film consists of five long shots, averaging about 16 minutes each. Four of the five have fixed camera positions.

It was first screened at the 2003 NHK Asian Film Festival and was also screened out of competition at the 2004 Cannes Film Festival.

== Filming locations ==
The original 2004 Cannes page states: "Finding himself in a house in the north of Iran by the Caspian Sea, the director picked up his handheld DV camera and began filming the seemingly anodyne events happening on the 500 metres of beach in front of his house".

A 2005 book The Cinema of Abbas Kiarostami by Alberto Elena also states that the film was made "[while the director was] staying on the shores of the Caspian Sea in the summer of 2002."

Two 2007 books state that four of the sequences are from the Caspian, except for the second which is from Spain.

According to IMDb, one filming location was the San Lorenzo Beach in Gijón, Asturias, Spain.

== Plot summary ==
The film consists of five long takes set by the ocean. As in a typical Ozu film, the camera never moves, zooms or pans. There is no dialogue, and only one shot includes people.

Five sequences: 1) A piece of driftwood on the seashore, carried about by the waves; 2) People walking on the seashore. The oldest ones stop by, look at the sea, then go away; 3) Blurry shapes on a winter beach. A herd of dogs. A love story; 4) A group of loud ducks cross the image, in one direction then the other; 5) A pond, at night. Frogs improvising a concert. A storm, then the sunrise.

== See also ==
- List of Iranian films
