= A Wedding Suit =

- Directed by: Abbas Kiarostami
- Written by: Abbas Kiarostami; Parviz Davayi
- Release date: 1976
- Running time: 57 minutes
- Country: Iran
- Language: Persian

A Wedding Suit (Persian: لباسی برای عروسی, Lebāsī Barāye Arūsī) is a 1976 Iranian comedy film directed by Abbas Kiarostami.

== Plot ==
A woman orders a suit from a tailor for her young son to wear to her sister's wedding. The tailor's apprentice, together with two other teenage boys who work in the same building, devise a plan to try on the suit at night to see what it feels like. Things get a little complicated but in the morning, at the last possible minute, they manage to return the suit to its proper place.

== See also ==
- List of Iranian films
