= The Experience (film) =

- Directed by: Abbas Kiarostami
- Written by: Abbas Kiarostami and Amir Naderi
- Release date: 1973
- Running time: 60 minutes
- Country: Iran
- Language: Persian

The Experience (Persian: تجربه, Tajrobe) is a 1973 Iranian feature film directed by Abbas Kiarostami. It is Kiarostami's feature-length directorial debut.

== Plot ==
Mamad, an orphaned teenager, works as a messenger boy in a photographic studio, where he also sleeps at night. Some bosses at his jobs are polite to him, others are so rude that he goes so far as to spit in their water. One day, while walking around, he falls platonically in love with a girl from a wealthier class. He thinks she likes him back so, later,thinking he sees her smiling at him, he decides to go to her house and ask for a job as a servant, so that he can be closer to her, but he receives only a decisive refusal.

== See also ==
- List of Iranian films
