= 24 Frames (film) =

2017 film

- Film poster
- Directed by: Abbas Kiarostami
- Written by: Abbas Kiarostami
- Produced by: Charles Gillibert; Ahmad Kiarostami
- Production companies: CG Cinema; Kiarostami Foundation
- Release date: 23 May 2017 (Cannes)
- Running time: 114 minutes
- Countries: Iran; France
- Language: Persian

24 Frames (Persian: ۲۴ فریم) is a 2017 Iranian experimental film directed by Abbas Kiarostami. It was his final feature film before his death in July 2016. It was posthumously shown in the 70th Anniversary Events section at the 2017 Cannes Film Festival.

== Synopsis ==
The film is structured in 24 chapters of "Frames" usually set in a fixed camera position filming a scene of nature or the seashore. The 'action' of each Frame is highly constrained and often focuses on either one or two animals either casually interacting or possibly vaguely interacting with one another. The opening Frame depicts the oil masterpiece by Bruegel of Hunters in the Snow and selectively animates the actions of one of the animals or birds depicted by Bruegel by superimposing movement upon Brugel's original canvas to suggest motion and life in process. The remainder of the Frames are fully grounded in real world depictions from a fixed camera perspective for the duration of the Frame, and center on various aspects of nature and wildlife.

== Release and critical reception ==
24 Frames premiered at the 70th Cannes Film Festival on 23 May 2017. In the United States, Janus Films began the film's limited release on 2 February 2018 at the Film Society of Lincoln Center.

=== Critical reception ===
On review aggregator website Rotten Tomatoes, the film has an approval rating of 92% based on 53 reviews, with an average rating of 7.6/10. The website's critical consensus reads, "24 Frames offers Kiarostami fans one final, affecting reminder of what made this filmmaker a talent to treasure." On Metacritic, which assigns a weighted average rating to reviews, the film has a weighted average score of 77 out of 100, based on 15 critics, indicating "generally favorable reviews".
