= First Case, Second Case =

- Directed by: Abbas Kiarostami
- Written by: Abbas Kiarostami
- Release date: 1979 (Iran)
- Running time: 53 minutes
- Country: Iran
- Language: Persian

First Case, Second Case (Persian: .قضیه شکل اول... شکل دوم, Qazieh-e shekl-e avval... shekl-e dovvom.) is a 1979 Iranian film directed by Abbas Kiarostami.

== Plot ==
The film starts with this scenario; A teacher is drawing a diagram of an ear on the chalkboard with his back to the class; he is interrupted several times by the sound of a pen banging rhythmically against a desk. Each time he turns around, the noise stops, only to resume again. Finally, unable to pick out the culprit, the teacher tells the seven boys sitting in the corner of the room to leave the class. The students are given an ultimatum, which becomes the basis of the film.

== Production ==
Kiarostami showed this film to the Shah's educational experts and filmed their opinions in 1979. Shooting was nearly complete when, on February 1, Ayatollah Khomeini arrived in Tehran from exile and 10 days later declared an Islamic republic. Kiarostami set about reimagining the film, junking the previous commentaries and changing the structure. Kiarostami decided to turn the film into a dramatized dilemma. First Case involved pupils refusing to name the guilty party, in Second Case one of the pupils names the culprit and is allowed to return to the classroom. All of the new observers, including the new education minister and members of political parties (Communist, National Democratic Front, National Front, Freedom Movement) were filmed commenting on the two cases. The film was banned after its premier and disappeared from view for decades until June 2009 when it reappeared and became widely distributed on the web.

== See also ==
- List of Iranian films
