= Orderly or Disorderly =

- Directed by: Abbas Kiarostami
- Written by: Abbas Kiarostami
- Release date: 1981
- Running time: 15 minutes
- Country: Iran
- Language: Persian

Orderly or Disorderly (Persian: به ترتیب یا بدون ترتیب؟, romanized: Be tartib ya bedun-e tartib?) is a 1981 Iranian short film directed by Abbas Kiarostami.

== Plot ==
The storyline of the 1981 Iranian short film Orderly or Disorderly by Abbas Kiarostami contrasts human behavior with a simple, structural idea. It functions as a split comparative study of social actions carried out in two contrasting ways.

== See also ==
- List of Iranian films
