= The Traveler (1974 film) =

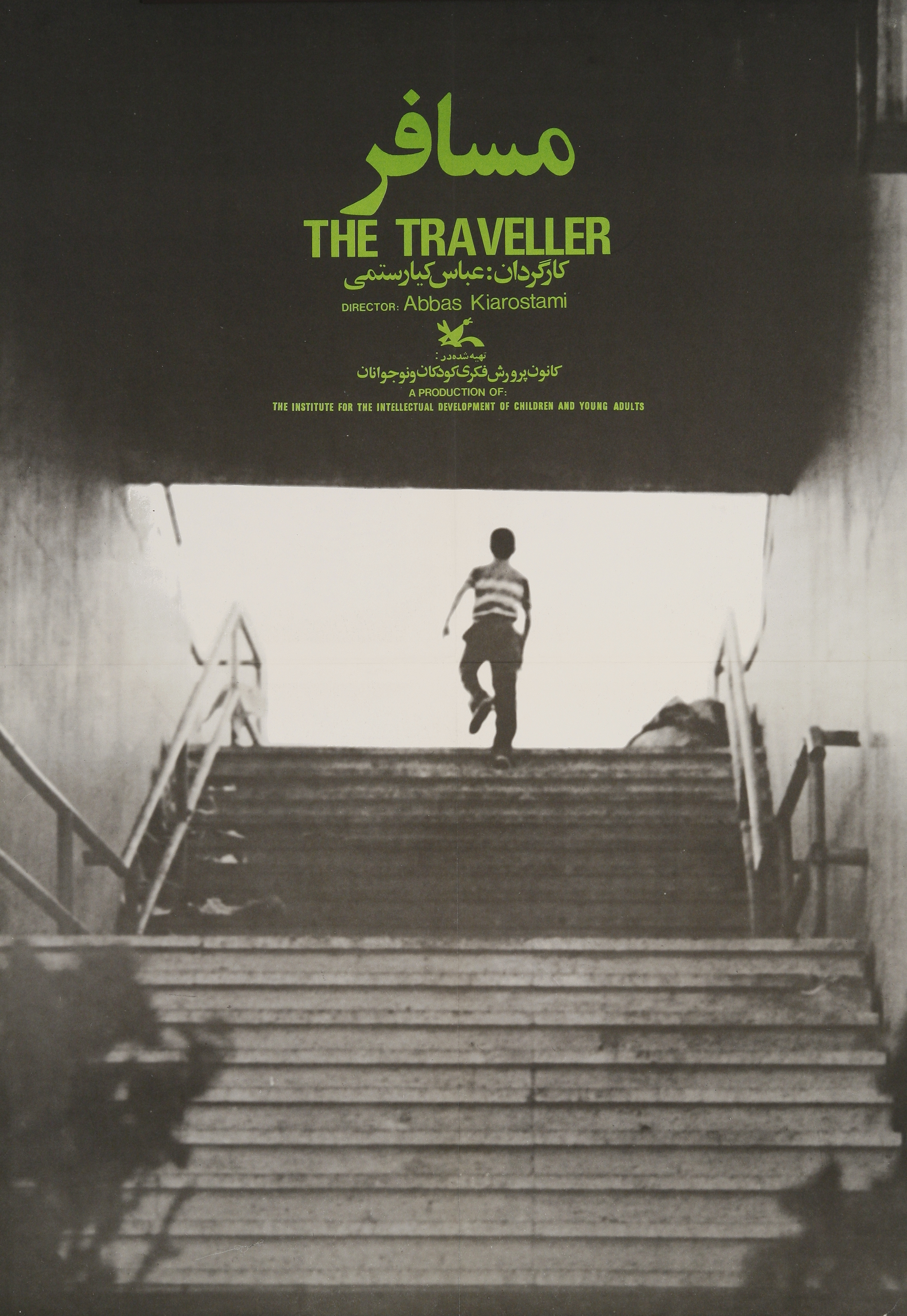
- Directed by: Abbas Kiarostami
- Written by: Abbas Kiarostami
- Distributed by: The Criterion Collection (R1 DVD, accompanied with Close-Up)
- Release date: 1974
- Running time: 71 min.
- Country: Iran
- Language: Persian

The Traveler (Persian: مسافر, Mosāfer) is a 1974 Iranian drama film directed by Abbas Kiarostami. The film depicts a troubled but resourceful boy's quest to attend a football match at any cost, and his indifference to the effects of his actions on other people, even those closest to him. Thematically, the film explores childhood, societal conventions, and the origins of moral and amoral behavior. Visually, it affords a candid glimpse of Iranian life in the early 1970s.

== Plot ==
The Traveler (1974 film)

Qassem Julayi (Ghāsem Jolā'i), played by Hassan Darabi, is a football-obsessed 12-year-old in the small city of Malayer, who would rather compete in the alley of his impoverished neighborhood after school than do his homework. His illiterate mother constantly berates him, but Qassem has long since learned to invent excuses for his poor school performance. In one early scene, we see him arriving late to school after going out of his way to purchase a football fan magazine. He appears with a bandage around his head, feigning a toothache. A few moments later, Qassam's skeptical teacher spots the magazine and snatches it away (only to start reading it himself). The boy resolves to travel by himself to Tehran, a 150-mile bus ride away, to attend an important game. Bus fare, however, is 10 tomans. The penniless Qassem pilfers 5 tomans that his mother has hidden, but the next day she discovers the theft and promptly reports it to the school principal, who not only berates her for raising a "monster" but canes Qassem's hands for refusing to admit guilt. That afternoon, Qassem and his friend Akbar roam the storefront vendors, attempting to sell small items to raise funds, but find no takers. The friend suggests selling an uncle's old box camera, but Qassem rejects one offer and instead hatches the scheme of pretending to take pictures of younger kids after school, collecting 5 rials for each "sitting." In a famous sequence, he issues directions to his "subjects" while snapping photo after photo with the empty camera. Onscreen, we see a succession of children posing for portraits that will never materialize. Still lacking sufficient cash, Qassem resolves to sell his team's soccer ball and goals, even though they are group property. Finally he has collected enough for his journey.

Late that evening, Qassem counts down the time in his squalid bedroom, then climbs down a drainpipe and runs through the dark streets to catch the bus to Tehran. Next morning, after the boy waits in a long queue to purchase admission to the stadium, the supply of tickets runs out as he's about to hand over the fee. Wandering among ticket scalpers, he tries to haggle but ends up paying an exorbitant price to finally gain entry. As the stadium seats fill up, he learns from the middle-aged man next to him that three hours remain until the game starts. Impatient, he has the man save his seat, and leaves to explore the athletic complex by himself. After small talk with a laborer, some clambering on a scaffold, and a wistful glimpse of an indoor swimming pool, Qassem lies down for a brief nap in the shade. His dreams are troubled by images of his own guilt and punishment. When he finally wakes, he finds the stadium empty and strewn with litter, the game long over.

== See also ==
- List of Iranian films
