= ABC Africa =

2001 film by Abbas Kiarostami

- Directed by: Abbas Kiarostami
- Release date: 2001
- Running time: 84 minutes
- Country: Iran
- Language: Persian

ABC Africa (Persian: ای‌بی‌سی آفریقا) is a 2001 Iranian documentary feature film directed by Abbas Kiarostami. It was screened out of competition at the 2001 Cannes Film Festival.

Invited by the United Nations to study the endeavors of the Uganda Women's Effort to Save Orphans, Kiarostami and his collaborator Seifollah Samadian initially went to the country to scout locations for a feature-length film. For Kiarostami, this film was a return to his early themes of resilient children in the face of adversity. Nevertheless, Iran’s foremost film-maker has succeeded in locating reasons for optimism among the nearly two million orphans left helpless by the ravages of civil war and AIDS.

== Synopsis ==
Set in a refugee camp in Kampala, Uganda, Kiarostami intersperses scenes of women and children dancing, singing, and laughing with somber images of the death rampant from numerous diseases. Sometimes critiqued as touristic, there are several scenes of the children laughing, making faces at the camera, and being astounded as they watch their friends be recorded. Although this film is likely not the somber reflection on AIDS and civil war originally envisioned by the United Nations, it is a documentary of Kiarostami and Samadian's trip to Uganda, and the earnest reactions of the impacted women and children. The candid and often silly scenes of the children contrast sharply with quiet images of death that speak to both the true tragedies occurring as well as the everyday joys that allow the women and children to continue.
