= So Can I =

- Directed by: Abbas Kiarostami
- Written by: Abbas Kiarostami
- Release date: 1975 (Iran)
- Running time: 3 min. 30 sec.
- Country: Iran
- Language: Persian

So Can I (Persian: منم می‌تونم, romanized: Manam mitunam) is a 1975 Iranian short film directed by Abbas Kiarostami.

== Plot ==
Two boys watch a cartoon film about various kinds of animals and one of them claims repeatedly that he can do the same things he sees the animals doing. But then the sight of birds flying plunges him into confusion: the film ends with the shot of an aeroplane circling the skies overhead.

== See also ==
- List of Iranian films
