= The Chorus (1982 film) =

- Directed by: Abbas Kiarostami
- Written by: Abbas Kiarostami
- Release date: 1982
- Running time: 17 minutes
- Country: Iran
- Language: Persian

The Chorus (Persian: همسرایان, Hamsorayan) is a 1982 Iranian short film directed by Abbas Kiarostami.

== See also ==
- List of Iranian films
