= The Wind Will Carry Us =

- Directed by: Abbas Kiarostami
- Written by: Abbas Kiarostami
- Produced by: Abbas Kiarostami
- Starring: Behzad Dorani
- Cinematography: Mahmoud Kalari
- Music by: Peyman Yazdanian
- Distributed by: New Yorker Films (USA)
- Release date: 6 September 1999 (Venice Film Festival)
- Running time: 118 minutes
- Language: Persian

The Wind Will Carry Us (Persian: باد ما را خواهد برد, Bād mā rā khāhad bord) is a 1999 Iranian film written and directed by Abbas Kiarostami. The title is a reference to a poem written by the modern Iranian poet Forugh Farrokhzad. In the film, a journalist posing as a city engineer arrives in a Kurdish village to document the locals' mourning rituals that anticipate the death of an old woman. However, she remains alive, and the journalist is forced to slow down and appreciate the lifestyle of the village.

The Wind Will Carry Us received positive reviews from critics. It was nominated for the Golden Lion at the 56th Venice International Film Festival. It won the Grand Special Jury Prize (Silver Lion), the FIPRESCI Prize, and the CinemAvvenire award at the festival. It received numerous other nominations and awards as well.

== Plot ==
A filmmaker and his two assistants (who are heard but never seen) arrive from Tehran to Siah Darreh, a village in Iranian Kurdistan, to film a documentary on Kurdish funeral rites. The locals do not know why they are there and the men spread a rumor that they are looking for treasure. During the course of the story, the team director receives calls from Tehran on his mobile phone, which only has coverage at the top of a nearby hill, where the cemetery is located. Every time it rings he has to take the car to go there. Days of waiting pass, the calls become more urgent and the comings and goings by car to the cemetery multiply while the event they are waiting for and that motivated their stay in the village does not occur. He will make friends with a boy whose uncle is his contact in the town.

== Reception ==
=== Reviews ===
The Wind Will Carry Us opened to critical acclaim. In a positive review, Jonathan Rosenbaum wrote, "This ambiguous comic masterpiece could be Abbas Kiarostami's greatest film to date; it's undoubtedly his richest and most challenging... You have to become friends with this movie before it opens up, but then its bounty is endless." The Seattle Post-Intelligencer's Sean Axmaker called it "a celebration of the human spirit nothing short of sublime." Michael Atkinson, after seeing the film in the first days of the year 2000, said, "[This is] the best film we'll see this year." J. Hoberman wrote, "It's part of the movie's formal brilliance that, suddenly, during its final 10 minutes, too much seems to be happening. The Wind Will Carry Us is a film about nothing and everything — life, death, the quality of light on dusty hills." On review aggregator Metacritic, the film has a score of 87/100 based on 19 reviews, indicating "universal acclaim". On Rotten Tomatoes it has a 97% approval rating based on 31 reviews.

=== Accolades ===
The Wind Will Carry Us was nominated for the Grand Prix of the Belgian Syndicate of Cinema Critics. After its screening at the 56th Venice International Film Festival, the film remained unreleased in the United States until 2000; later it enjoyed a rediscovery among both the public and mainstream critics during the late 2000s after many critics named it one of the best films of that decade. Variety's Scott Foundas placed it ahead of Peter Watkins' La Commune (Paris, 1871) and Paul Thomas Anderson's There Will Be Blood, writing:

"Screened in festivals in 1999, but not released in the US until the following year, this fin de siècle/millennium fable by the great Iranian auteur seemed to anticipate many of the dramatic changes that would sweep through filmmaking over the decade to come. In it, an engineer (who turns out to be a kind of filmmaker) travels to a remote Kurdish village with the intent of photographing the funeral rites of a dying 100-year-old woman, and the witty, haunting, poetic film that follows is about his—and Kiarostami's own—struggle to complete that mission, to capture something of real life on film without violating its essence."

In a 2012 poll by the British Film Institute, seven critics ranked The Wind Will Carry Us one of their 10 favorite films.
