= The Bread and Alley =

1970 film

- Screenshot from the film
- Directed by: Abbas Kiarostami
- Written by: Abbas Kiarostami
- Release date: 1970
- Running time: 10 minutes
- Country: Iran
- Language: No dialogue

The Bread and Alley (Persian: نان و کوچه, Nān o Kūcheh) is a 1970 Iranian short film directed and written by Abbas Kiarostami. The ten-minute film was the first film directed by Kiarostami.

Shot in black and white, the film tells the story of a little boy walking home with a loaf of bread who is confronted by a hungry dog, placing his safety at risk.

== Plot ==
The Bread and Alley (1970)

Returning from an errand to buy bread, a boy finds a menacing dog blocking his way through the alley he must pass to get home. Frightened by the dog's barking, he follows a man down the alley, but the man enters his own home, and the boy must find a solution all by himself: he throws the dog a piece of bread and, while the animal is devouring it, he continues on his way home, accompanied by the now friendly dog, who lies down outside his gate. Afterwards, another boy with a bowl of yogurt encounters the same dog, who again starts barking. The viewer is left to reflect that the solution which worked for the first boy cannot be applied by the second boy. This is how Kiarostami shows the unique experience of each person.

== See also ==
- List of Iranian films
