= Abbas Kiarostami =

Iranian filmmaker (1941–2016)

- عباس کیارستمی
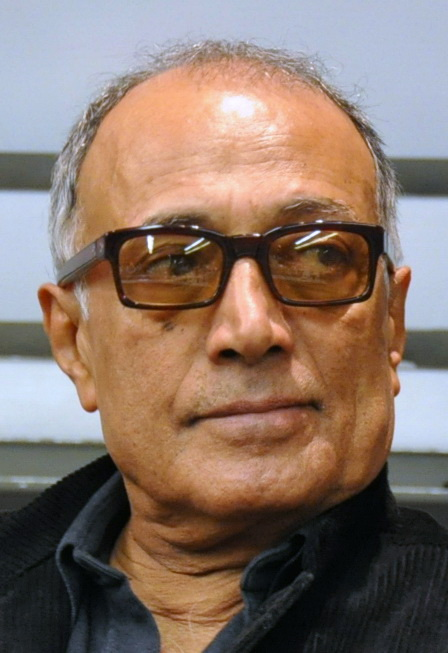
- Kiarostami in 2013
- Born: 22 June 1940; Tehran, Imperial State of Iran
- Died: 4 July 2016 (aged 76); Paris, France
- Burial place: Tok Mazra'eh Cemetery, Lavasan, Shemiranat, Iran
- Education: University of Tehran
- Occupations: Filmmaker; Screenwriter; photographer; producer; painter; poet
- Years active: 1962–2016
- Notable work: Where Is the Friend's Home?; Close-Up; Through the Olive Trees; Taste of Cherry; The Wind Will Carry Us
- Style: Documentary; minimalism; poetry film
- Movement: Iranian New Wave
- Spouse: Parvin Amir-Gholi (m. 1969; div. 1982)
- Partner: Niki Karimi (1995–2007)
- Children: Ahmad; Bahman

Abbas Kiarostami (Persian: عباس کیارستمی [ʔæbˌbɒːs kijɒːɾostæˈmi]; 22 June 1940 – 4 July 2016) was an Iranian film director, screenwriter, poet, photographer, and film producer. An active filmmaker from 1970, Kiarostami had been involved in the production of over forty films, including multiple shorts and documentaries. Kiarostami attained critical acclaim for directing the Koker trilogy (1987–1994), Close-Up (1990), The Wind Will Carry Us (1999), and Taste of Cherry (1997), which was awarded the Palme d'Or at the Cannes Film Festival that year. His films Where Is the Friend's House? (1987), Close-Up, and The Wind Will Carry Us were ranked among the 100 best foreign films in a 2018 critics' poll by BBC Culture. Close-Up was also ranked one of the 50 greatest movies of all time in the famous decennial Sight & Sound poll conducted in 2012. He is widely regarded as one of the greatest and most influential filmmakers of all time.

Kiarostami worked extensively as a screenwriter, film editor, art director, and producer. He was also a poet, photographer, painter, illustrator, and graphic designer. He was part of a generation of filmmakers in the Iranian New Wave, a Persian cinema movement that started in the late 1960s and emphasized the use of poetic dialogue and allegorical storytelling dealing with political and philosophical issues.

Kiarostami had a reputation for using child protagonists, for documentary-style narrative films, for stories that take place in rural villages, and for conversations that unfold inside cars, using stationary mounted cameras. He is also known for his use of Persian poetry in the dialogue, titles, and themes of his films. Kiarostami's films contain a notable degree of ambiguity, an unusual mixture of simplicity and complexity, and often a mix of fictional and documentary elements. The concepts of change and continuity, in addition to the themes of life and death, play a major role in Kiarostami's works.

== Early life and background ==
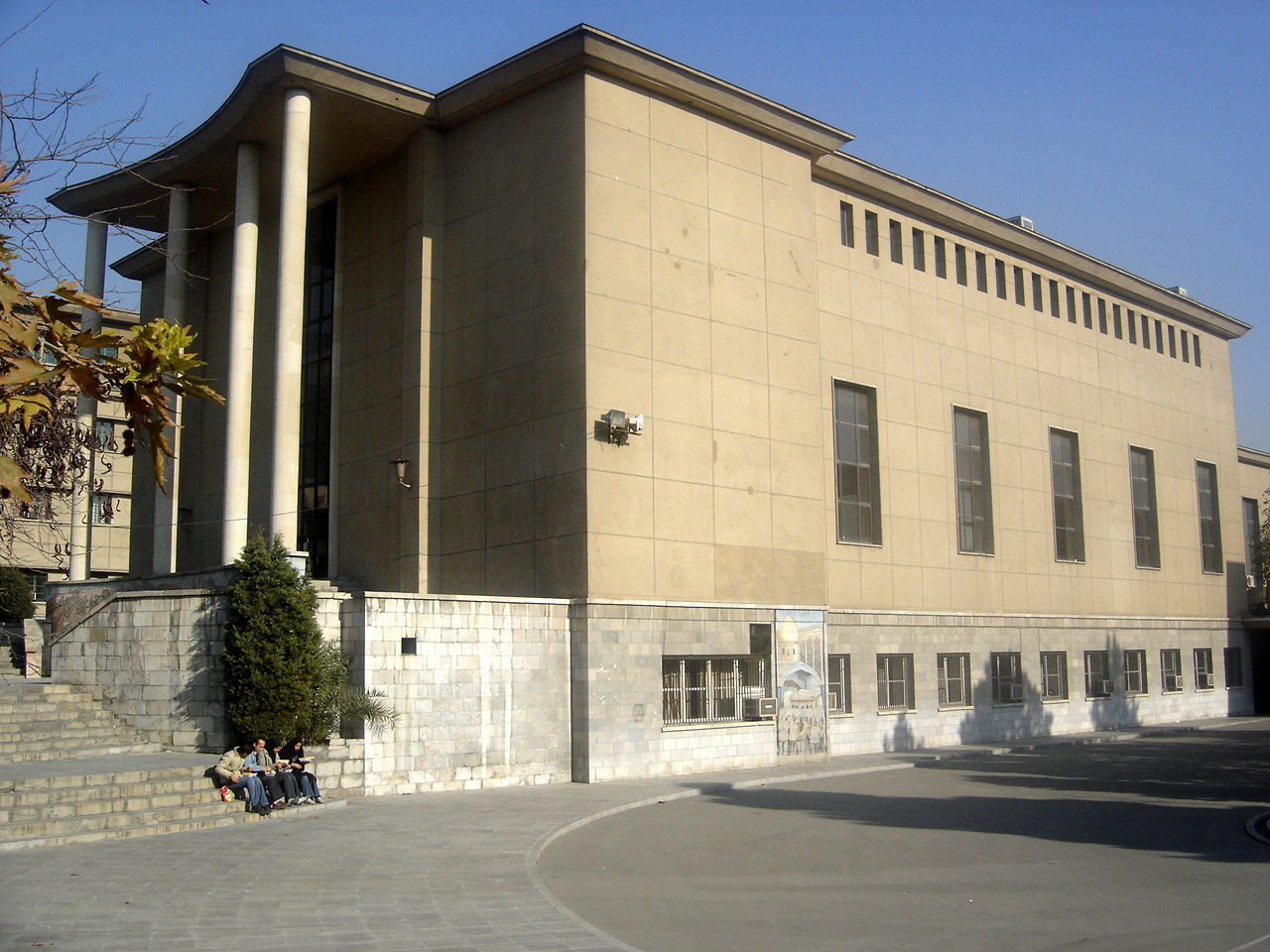
Kiarostami majored in painting and graphic design at the University of Tehran College of Fine arts.

Kiarostami was born in Tehran to a Persian family. His first artistic experience was painting, which he continued into his late teens, winning a painting competition at the age of 18 shortly before he left home to study at the University of Tehran School of Fine Arts. He majored in painting and graphic design and supported his studies by working as a traffic policeman.

As a painter, designer, and illustrator, Kiarostami worked in advertising in the 1960s, designing posters and creating commercials. Between 1962 and 1966, he shot around 150 advertisements for Iranian television. In the late 1960s, he began creating credit titles for films (including Gheysar by Masoud Kimiai) and illustrating children's books.

== Film career ==
=== 1970s ===
In 1970 when the Iranian New Wave began with Dariush Mehrjui's film Gāv, Kiarostami helped set up a filmmaking department at the Institute for the Intellectual Development of Children and Young Adults (Kanoon) in Tehran. Its debut production, and Kiarostami's first film, was the twelve-minute The Bread and Alley (1970), a neorealistic short film about a schoolboy's confrontation with an aggressive dog. Breaktime followed in 1972. The department became one of Iran's most noted film studios, producing not only Kiarostami's films but acclaimed Persian films such as The Runner and Bashu, the Little Stranger.

In the 1970s, Kiarostami pursued an individualistic style of filmmaking. When discussing his first film, he stated:

Bread and Alley was my first experience in cinema and I must say a very difficult one. I had to work with a very young child, a dog, and an unprofessional crew except for the cinematographer, who was nagging and complaining all the time. Well, the cinematographer, in a sense, was right because I did not follow the conventions of film making that he had become accustomed to.

Following The Experience (1973), Kiarostami released The Traveler (Mossafer) in 1974. The Traveler tells the story of Qassem Julayi, a troubled and troublesome boy from a small Iranian city. Intent on attending a football match in far-off Tehran, he scams his friends and neighbors to raise money, and journeys to the stadium in time for the game, only to meet with an ironic twist of fate. In addressing the boy's determination to reach his goal, alongside his indifference to the effects of his amoral actions, the film examined human behavior and the balance of right and wrong. It furthered Kiarostami's reputation for realism, diegetic simplicity, and stylistic complexity, as well as his fascination with physical and spiritual journeys.

In 1975, Kiarostami directed two short films So Can I and Two Solutions for One Problem. In early 1976, he released Colors, followed by the fifty-four-minute film A Wedding Suit, a story about three teenagers coming into conflict over a suit for a wedding.

Kiarostami in 1977

Kiarostami then directed Report (1977). With a 112-minute runtime, it was considerably longer than his previous work. The film revolved around the life of a tax collector accused of accepting bribes; suicide was among its themes. In 1979, he produced and directed First Case, Second Case.

=== 1980s ===
In the early 1980s, Kiarostami directed several short films including Toothache (1980), Orderly or Disorderly (1981), and The Chorus (1982). In 1983, he directed Fellow Citizen. It was not until his release of Where Is the Friend's Home? (1987) that he began to gain recognition outside Iran. These films created the basis of his later productions.

The film tells a simple account of a conscientious eight-year-old schoolboy's quest to return his friend's notebook in a neighboring village lest his friend be expelled from school. The traditional beliefs of Iranian rural people are portrayed. The film has been noted for its poetic use of the Iranian rural landscape and its realism, both important elements of Kiarostami's work. Kiarostami made the film from a child's point of view.

Where Is the Friend's House? (1987), And Life Goes On (1992) (also known as Life and Nothing More), and Through the Olive Trees (1994) are described by critics as the Koker trilogy, because all three films feature the village of Koker in northern Iran. The films also relate to the 1990 Manjil–Rudbar earthquake, in which 40,000 people died. Kiarostami uses the themes of life, death, change, and continuity to connect the films. The trilogy was successful in France in the 1990s and other Western European countries such as the Netherlands, Sweden, Germany and Finland. But, Kiarostami did not consider the three films to comprise a trilogy. He suggested that the last two titles plus Taste of Cherry (1997) comprise a trilogy, given their common theme of the preciousness of life. In 1987, Kiarostami was involved in the screenwriting of The Key, which he edited but did not direct. In 1989, he released Homework.

=== 1990s ===
Kiarostami's first film of the decade was Close-Up (1990), which narrates the story of the real-life trial of a man who impersonated film-maker Mohsen Makhmalbaf, conning a family into believing they would star in his new film. The family suspects theft as the motive for this charade, but the impersonator, Hossein Sabzian, argues that his motives were more complex. The part-documentary, part-staged film examines Sabzian's moral justification for usurping Makhmalbaf's identity, questioning his ability to sense his cultural and artistic flair. Ranked No. 42 in British Film Institute's The Top 50 Greatest Films of All Time, Close-Up received praise from directors such as Quentin Tarantino, Martin Scorsese, Werner Herzog, Jean-Luc Godard, and Nanni Moretti and was released across Europe.

In 1992, Kiarostami directed Life, and Nothing More..., regarded by critics as the second film of the Koker trilogy. The film follows a father and his young son as they drive from Tehran to Koker in search of two young boys who they fear might have perished in the 1990 earthquake. As the father and son travel through the devastated landscape, they meet earthquake survivors forced to carry on with their lives amid disaster. That year Kiarostami won a Prix Roberto Rossellini, the first professional film award of his career, for his direction of the film. The last film of the so-called Koker trilogy was Through the Olive Trees (1994), which expands a peripheral scene from Life and Nothing More into the central drama. Critics such as Adrian Martin have called the style of filmmaking in the Koker trilogy as "diagrammatical", linking the zig-zagging patterns in the landscape and the geometry of forces of life and the world. A flashback of the zigzag path in Life and Nothing More... (1992) in turn triggers the spectator's memory of the previous film, Where Is the Friend's Home? from 1987, shot before the earthquake. This symbolically links to the post-earthquake reconstruction in Through the Olive Trees in 1994. In 1995, Miramax Films released Through the Olive Trees in the US theaters.

Kiarostami next wrote the screenplays for The Journey and The White Balloon (1995), for his former assistant Jafar Panahi. Between 1995 and 1996, he was involved in the production of Lumière and Company, a collaboration with 40 other film directors.

Kiarostami won the Palme d'Or (Golden Palm) award at the Cannes Film Festival for Taste of Cherry. It is the drama of a man, Mr. Badii, determined to commit suicide. The film involved themes such as morality, the legitimacy of the act of suicide, and the meaning of compassion.

Kiarostami directed The Wind Will Carry Us in 1999, which won the Grand Jury Prize (Silver Lion) at the Venice International Film Festival. The film contrasted rural and urban views on the dignity of labor, addressing themes of gender equality and the benefits of progress, by means of a stranger's sojourn in a remote Kurdish village. An unusual feature of the movie is that many of the characters are heard but not seen; at least thirteen to fourteen speaking characters in the film are never seen.

=== 2000s ===
In 2000, at the San Francisco Film Festival award ceremony, Kiarostami was awarded the Akira Kurosawa Prize for lifetime achievement in directing, but surprised everyone by giving it away to veteran Iranian actor Behrooz Vossoughi for his contribution to Iranian cinema.

In 2001, Kiarostami and his assistant Seifollah Samadian traveled to Kampala, Uganda, at the request of the United Nations International Fund for Agricultural Development, to film a documentary about programs assisting Ugandan orphans. He stayed for ten days and made ABC Africa. The trip was originally intended as research in preparation for the filming, but Kiarostami ended up editing the entire film from the video footage shot there. The high number of orphans in Uganda has resulted from the deaths of parents in the AIDS epidemic.

Time Out editor and National Film Theatre chief programmer, Geoff Andrew, said in referring to the film: "Like his previous four features, this film is not about death but life-and-death: how they're linked, and what attitude we might adopt with regard to their symbiotic inevitability."

The following year, Kiarostami directed Ten. The film is seen through the eyes of one woman as she drives through the streets of Tehran over a period of several days. Her journey is composed of ten conversations with various passengers, which include her sister, a hitchhiking prostitute, and a jilted bride and her demanding young son. Kiarostami abandoned many scriptwriting conventions and focused on the socio-political landscape of Iran. This style of filmmaking was praised by a number of critics.

A. O. Scott in The New York Times wrote that Kiarostami, "in addition to being perhaps the most internationally admired Iranian filmmaker of the past decade, is also among the world masters of automotive cinema...He understands the automobile as a place of reflection, observation and, above all, talk."

In 2003, Kiarostami directed Five, a poetic feature with no dialogue or characterization. It consists of five long shots of nature which are single-take sequences, shot with a hand-held DV camera, along the shores of the Caspian Sea. Although the film lacks a clear storyline, Geoff Andrew argues that the film is "more than just pretty pictures". He adds, "Assembled in order, they comprise a kind of abstract or emotional narrative arc, which moves evocatively from separation and solitude to community, from motion to rest, near-silence to sound and song, light to darkness and back to light again, ending on a note of rebirth and regeneration."He notes the degree of artifice concealed behind the apparent simplicity of the imagery.

In 2005, Kiarostami contributed the central section to Tickets, a portmanteau film set on a train traveling through Italy. The other segments were directed by Ken Loach and Ermanno Olmi.

In 2008, Kiarostami directed the feature Shirin, which features close-ups of many notable Iranian actresses and the French actress Juliette Binoche as they watch a film based on a partly mythological Persian romance tale of Khosrow and Shirin, with themes of female self-sacrifice. The film has been described as "a compelling exploration of the relationship between image, sound and female spectatorship."

That summer, he directed Wolfgang Amadeus Mozart's opera Così fan tutte conducted by Christophe Rousset at Festival d'Aix-en-Provence starring with William Shimell. But the following year's performances at the English National Opera was impossible to direct because of refusal of permission to travel abroad.

=== 2010s ===
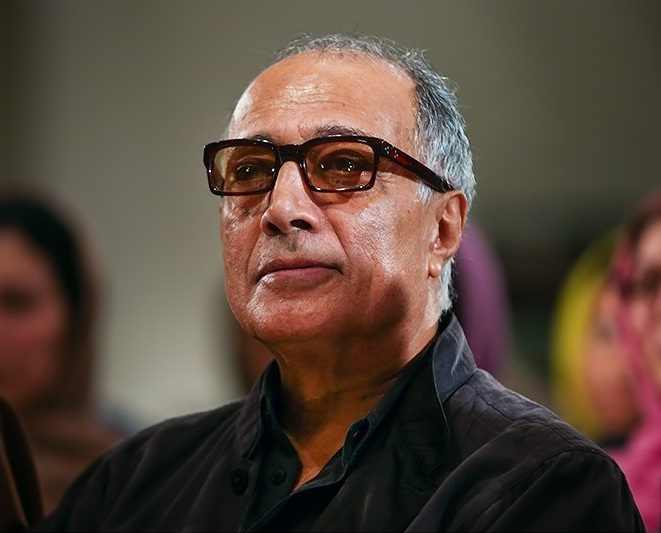
Kiarostami in 2015

Certified Copy (2010), again starring Juliette Binoche, was made in Tuscany and was Kiarostami's first film to be shot and produced outside Iran. The story of an encounter between a British man and a French woman, it was entered in competition for the Palme d'Or in the 2010 Cannes Film Festival. Peter Bradshaw of The Guardian describes the film as an "intriguing oddity", and said, "Certified Copy is the deconstructed portrait of a marriage, acted with well-intentioned fervour by Juliette Binoche, but persistently baffling, contrived, and often simply bizarre – a highbrow misfire of the most peculiar sort." He concluded that the film is "unmistakably an example of Kiarostami's compositional technique, though not a successful example." Roger Ebert praised the film, noting that "Kiarostami is rather brilliant in the way he creates offscreen spaces." Binoche won the Best Actress Award at Cannes for her performance in the film. Kiarostami's penultimate film, Like Someone in Love, set and shot in Japan, received largely positive reviews from critics.

Kiarostami's final film 24 Frames was released posthumously in 2017. An experimental film based on 24 of Kiarostami's still photographs, 24 Frames enjoyed a highly positive critical reception, with a Rotten Tomatoes score of 92%.

=== Film festival work ===
Kiarostami was a jury member at numerous film festivals, most notably the Cannes Film Festival in 1993, 2002 and 2005. He was also the president of the Caméra d'Or Jury in Cannes Film Festival 2005. He was announced as the president of the Cinéfondation and short film sections of the 2014 Cannes Film Festival.

Other representatives include the Venice Film Festival in 1985, the Locarno International Film Festival in 1990, the San Sebastian International Film Festival in 1996, the São Paulo International Film Festival in 2004, the Capalbio Cinema Festival in 2007 (in which he was president of the jury), and the Küstendorf Film and Music Festival in 2011. He also made appearances at many other film festivals across Europe, including the Estoril Film Festival in Portugal.

== Cinematic style ==
=== Individualism ===
Though Kiarostami has been compared to Satyajit Ray, Vittorio De Sica, Éric Rohmer, and Jacques Tati, his films exhibit a singular style, often employing techniques of his own invention.

During the filming of The Bread and Alley in 1970, Kiarostami had major differences with his experienced cinematographer about how to film the boy and the attacking dog. While the cinematographer wanted separate shots of the boy approaching, a close-up of his hand as he enters the house and closes the door, followed by a shot of the dog, Kiarostami believed that if the three scenes could be captured as a whole it would have a more profound impact in creating tension over the situation. That one shot took around forty days to complete until Kiarostami was fully content with the scene. Kiarostami later commented that the breaking of scenes would have disrupted the rhythm and content of the film's structure, preferring to let the scene flow as one.

Unlike other directors, Kiarostami showed no interest in staging extravagant combat scenes or complicated chase scenes in large-scale productions, instead attempting to mold the medium of film to his own specifications. Kiarostami appeared to have settled on his style with the Koker trilogy, which included a myriad of references to his own film material, connecting common themes and subject matter between each of the films. Stephen Bransford has contended that Kiarostami's films do not contain references to the work of other directors, but are fashioned in such a manner that they are self-referenced. Bransford believes his films are often fashioned into an ongoing dialectic with one film reflecting on and partially demystifying an earlier film.

He continued experimenting with new modes of filming, using different directorial methods and techniques. A case in point is Ten, which was filmed in a moving automobile in which Kiarostami was not present. He gave suggestions to the actors about what to do, and a camera placed on the dashboard filmed them while they drove around Tehran. The camera was allowed to roll, capturing the faces of the people involved during their daily routine, using a series of extreme-close shots. Ten was an experiment that used digital cameras to virtually eliminate the director. This new direction towards a digital micro-cinema is defined as a micro-budget filmmaking practice, allied with a digital production basis.

Kiarostami's cinema offers a different definition of film. According to film professors such as Jamsheed Akrami of William Paterson University, Kiarostami consistently tried to redefine film by forcing the increased involvement of the audience. In his later years, he also progressively trimmed the timespan within his films. Akrami thinks that this reduces filmmaking from a collective endeavor to a purer, more basic form of artistic expression.

=== Fiction and non-fiction ===
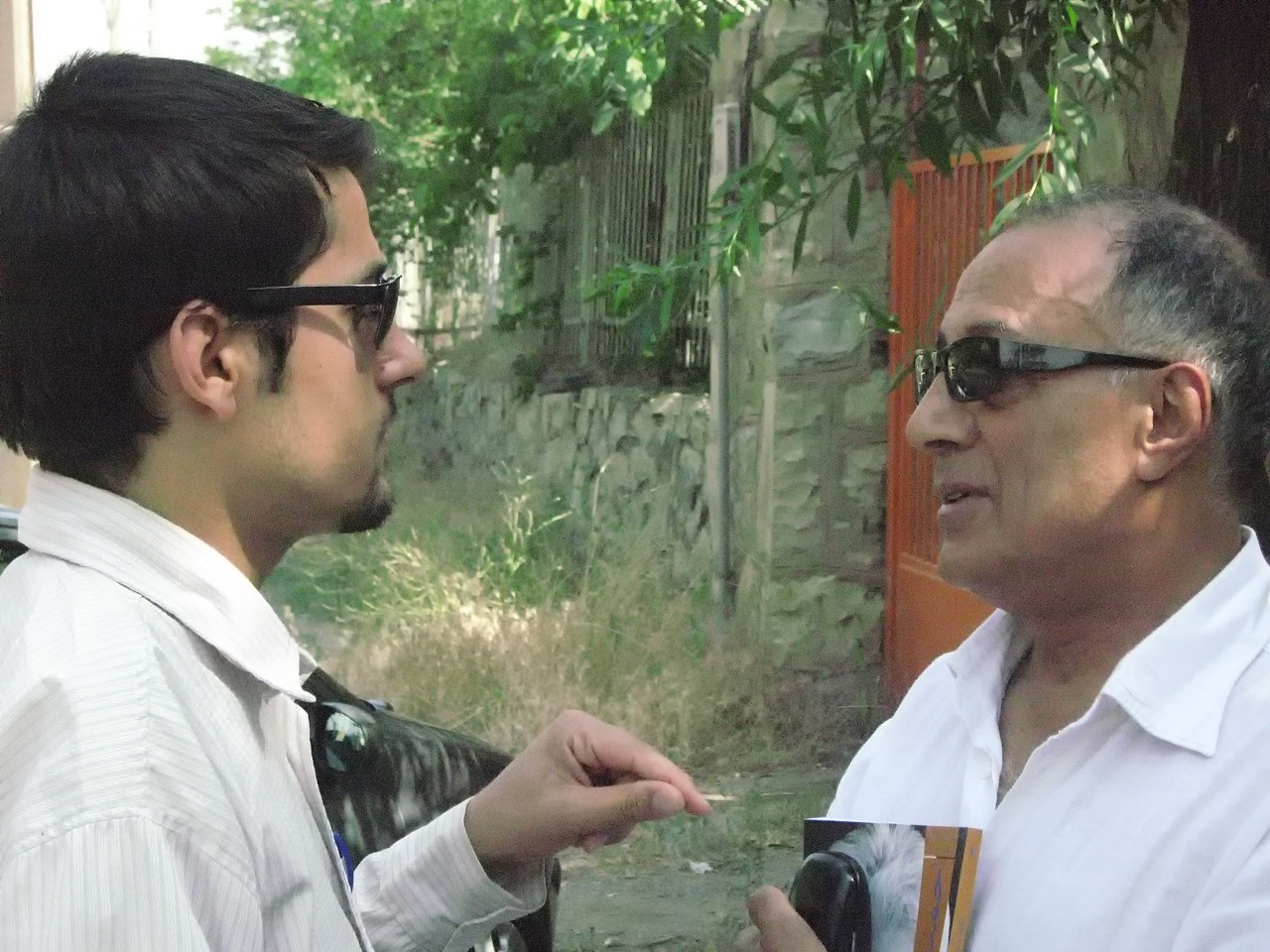
Kiarostami interviewing with Habib Bavi in 2013

Kiarostami's films contain a notable degree of ambiguity, an unusual mixture of simplicity and complexity, and often a mix of fictional and documentary elements (docufiction). Kiarostami has stated, "We can never get close to the truth except through lying."

The boundary between fiction and non-fiction is significantly reduced in Kiarostami's cinema. The French philosopher Jean-Luc Nancy, writing about Kiarostami, and in particular Life and Nothing More..., has argued that his films are neither quite fiction nor quite documentary. Life and Nothing More..., he argues, is neither representation nor reportage, but rather "evidence":

[I]t all looks like reporting, but everything underscores (indique à l'évidence) that it is the fiction of a documentary (in fact, Kiarostami shot the film several months after the earthquake), and that it is rather a document about "fiction": not in the sense of imagining the unreal, but in the very specific and precise sense of the technique, of the art of constructing images. For the image by means of which, each time, each opens a world and precedes himself in it (s'y précède) is not pregiven (donnée toute faite) (as are those of dreams, phantasms or bad films): it is to be invented, cut and edited. Thus it is evidence, insofar as, if one day I happen to look at my street on which I walk up and down ten times a day, I construct for an instant a new evidence of my street.

For Jean-Luc Nancy, this notion of cinema as "evidence", rather than as documentary or imagination, is tied to the way Kiarostami deals with life-and-death (cf. the remark by Geoff Andrew on ABC Africa, cited above, to the effect that Kiarostami's films are not about death but about life-and-death):

Existence resists the indifference of life-and-death, it lives beyond mechanical "life", it is always its own mourning, and its own joy. It becomes figure, image. It does not become alienated in images, but it is presented there: the images are the evidence of its existence, the objectivity of its assertion. This thought—which, for me, is the very thought of this film [Life and Nothing More...]—is a difficult thought, perhaps the most difficult. It's a slow thought, always underway, fraying a path so that the path itself becomes thought. It is that which frays images so that images become this thought, so that they become the evidence of this thought—and not to "represent" it.

In other words, wanting to accomplish more than just represent life and death as opposing forces, but rather to illustrate the way in which each element of nature is inextricably linked, Kiarostami devised a cinema that does more than just present the viewer with the documentable "facts", but neither is it simply a matter of artifice. Because "existence" means more than simply life, it is projective, containing an irreducibly fictive element, but in this "being more than" life, it is therefore contaminated by mortality. Nancy is giving a clue, in other words, toward the interpretation of Kiarostami's statement that lying is the only way to truth.

=== Themes of life and death ===
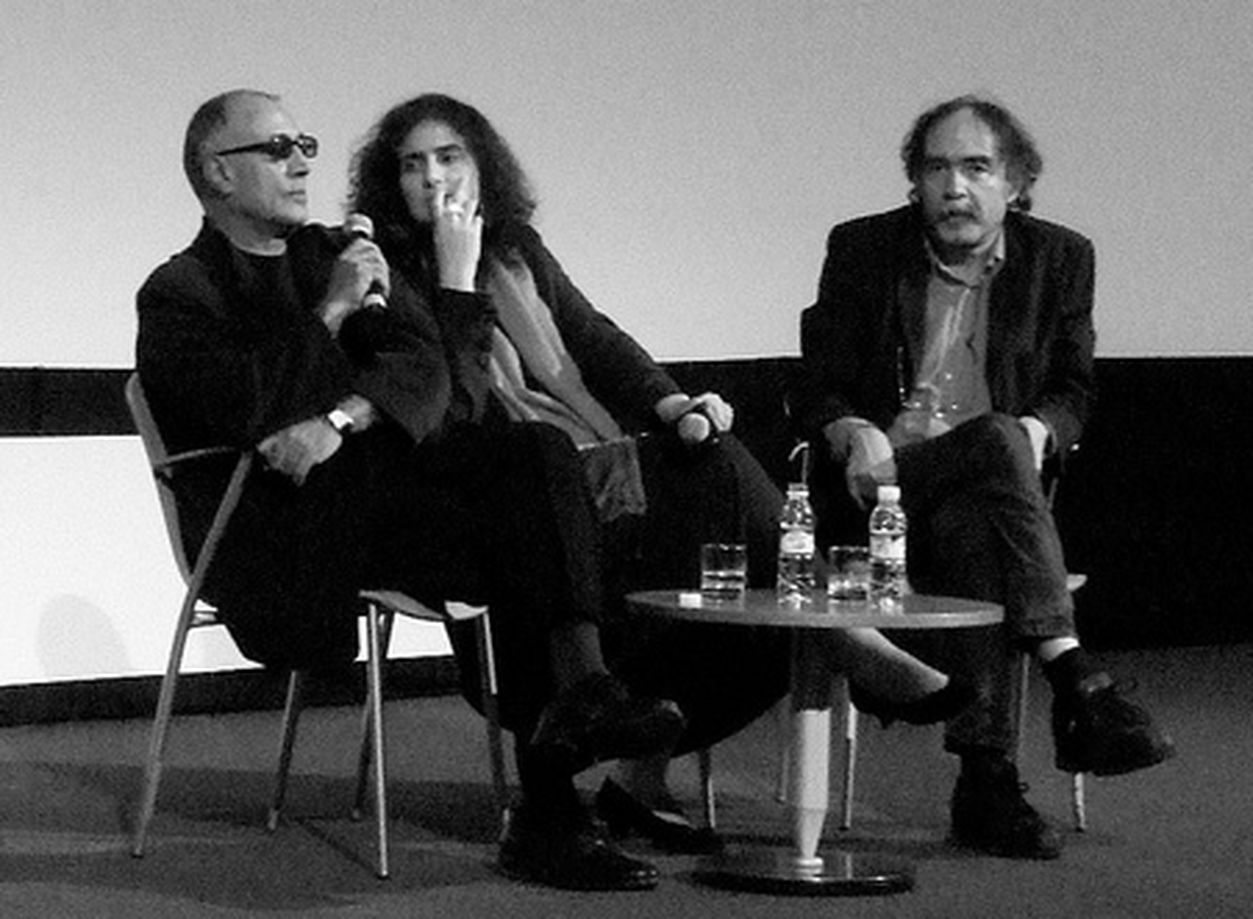
Kiarostami (left) at the Estoril Film Festival in 2010

The concepts of change and continuity, in addition to the themes of life and death, play a major role in Kiarostami's works. In the Koker trilogy, these themes play a central role. As illustrated in the aftermath of the 1990 Manjil–Rudbar earthquake disaster, they also represent the power of human resilience to overcome and defy destruction.

Unlike the Koker films, which convey an instinctual thirst for survival, Taste of Cherry explores the fragility of life and focuses on how precious it is.

Some film critics believe that the assemblage of light versus dark scenes in Kiarostami's film grammar, such as in Taste of Cherry and The Wind Will Carry Us, suggests the mutual existence of life with its endless possibilities, and death as a factual moment of anyone's life.

=== Poetry and imagery ===
Ahmad Karimi-Hakkak, of the University of Maryland, argues that one aspect of Kiarostami's cinematic style is that he is able to capture the essence of Persian poetry and create poetic imagery within the landscape of his films. In several of his movies such as Where is the Friend's Home and The Wind Will Carry Us, classical Persian poetry is directly quoted in the film, highlighting the artistic link and intimate connection between them. This in turn reflects on the connection between the past and present, between continuity and change. The characters recite poems mainly from classical Persian poet Omar Khayyám or modern Persian poets such as Sohrab Sepehri and Forough Farrokhzad. One scene in The Wind Will Carry Us has a long shot of a wheat field with rippling golden crops through which the doctor, accompanied by the filmmaker, is riding his scooter in a twisting road. In response to the comment that the other world is a better place than this one, the doctor recites this poem of Khayyam:

They promise of houries in heaven
But I would say wine is better
Take the present to the promises
A drum sounds melodious from distance

It has been argued that the creative merit of Kiarostami's adaptation of Sohrab Sepehri and Forough Farrokhzad's poems extends the domain of textual transformation. Adaptation is defined as the transformation of a prior to a new text. Sima Daad of the University of Washington contends that Kiarostami's adaptation arrives at the theoretical realm of adaptation by expanding its limit from inter-textual potential to trans-generic potential.

=== Spirituality ===
Kiarostami's "complex" sound-images and philosophical approach have caused frequent comparisons with "mystical" filmmakers such as Andrei Tarkovsky and Robert Bresson. While acknowledging substantial cultural differences, much of Western critical writing about Kiarostami positions him as the Iranian equivalent of such directors, by virtue of a similarly austere, "spiritual" poetics and moral commitment. Some draw parallels between certain imagery in Kiarostami's films with that of Sufi concepts.

While most English-language writers, such as David Sterritt and the Spanish film professor Alberto Elena, interpret Kiarostami's films as spiritual, other critics, including David Walsh and Hamish Ford, have rated the influence of spirituality in his films as lower.

== Poetry, art and photography ==
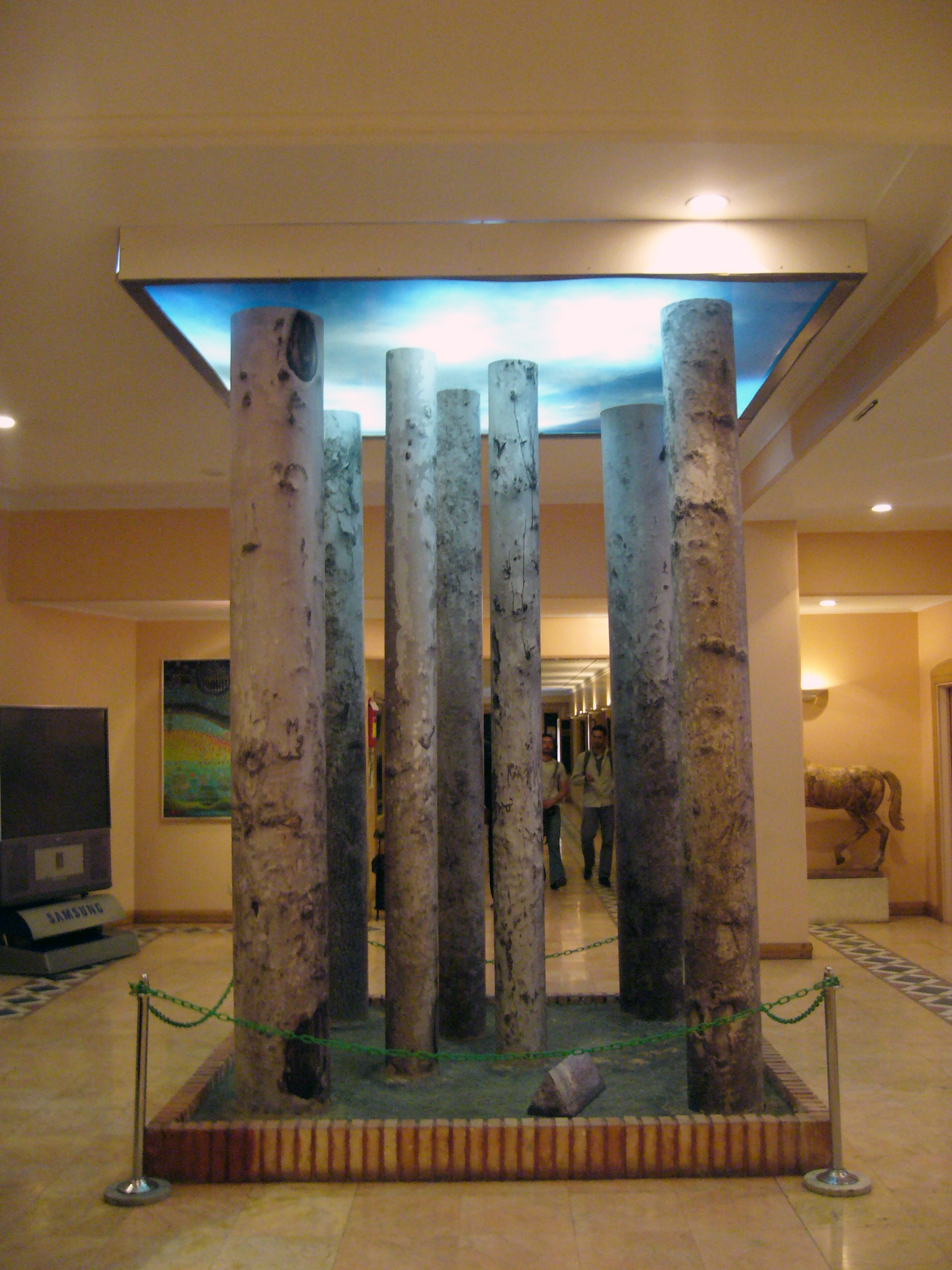
Installation art by Abbas Kiarostami

Kiarostami, along with Jean Cocteau, Satyajit Ray, Pier Paolo Pasolini, Derek Jarman, and Alejandro Jodorowsky, was a filmmaker who expressed himself in other genres, such as poetry, set designs, painting, or photography. They expressed their interpretation of the world and their understanding of our preoccupations and identities.

Kiarostami was a noted photographer and poet. A bilingual collection of more than 200 of his poems, Walking with the Wind, was published by Harvard University Press. His photographic work includes Untitled Photographs, a collection of over thirty photographs, mostly of snow landscapes, taken in his hometown Tehran, between 1978 and 2003. In 1999, he also published a collection of his poems. Kiarostami also produced Mozart's opera Così fan tutte, which premiered in Aix-en-Provence in 2003 before being performed at the English National Opera in London in 2004.

Riccardo Zipoli, from the Ca' Foscari University of Venice, has studied the relations and interconnections between Kiarostami's poems and his films. The results of the analysis reveal how Kiarostami's treatment of "uncertain reality" is similar in his poems and films. Kiarostami's poetry is reminiscent of the later nature poems of the Persian painter-poet Sohrab Sepehri. On the other hand, the succinct allusion to philosophical truths without the need for deliberation, the non-judgmental tone of the poetic voice, and the structure of the poem—absence of personal pronouns, adverbs, or over-reliance on adjectives—as well as the lines containing a kigo (季語, a "season word") gives much of this poetry a haikuesque characteristic.

Kiarostami's three volumes of original verse, plus his selections from classical and contemporary Persian poets, including Nima, Hafez, Rumi and Saadi, were translated into English in 2015 and were published in bilingual (Persian/English) editions by Sticking Place Books in New York.

== Personal life ==
In 1969, Kiarostami married Parvin Amir-Gholi. They had two sons, Ahmad and Bahman. They divorced in 1982. He had a twelve-year relationship with actress Niki Karimi.

Kiarostami was one of the few directors who remained in Iran after the 1979 revolution, when many of his peers fled the country. He believes that it was one of the most important decisions of his career. His permanent base in Iran and his national identity have consolidated his ability as a filmmaker:

When you take a tree that is rooted in the ground and transfer it from one place to another, the tree will no longer bear fruit. And if it does, the fruit will not be as good as it was in its original place. This is a rule of nature. I think if I had left my country, I would be the same as the tree.

Kiarostami frequently wore dark spectacles or sunglasses, which he required because of a sensitivity to light.

In a 2007 interview with The New York Times, asked if he professes Shi'a Islam, Kiarostami responded that "I am not politically religious, but I have some beliefs."

== Illness and death ==
In March 2016, Kiarostami was hospitalized due to intestinal bleeding and reportedly went into a coma after undergoing two operations. Sources, including a Ministry of Health and Medical Education spokesman, reported that Kiarostami was suffering from gastrointestinal cancer. On 3 April 2016, Reza Paydar, the director of Kiarostami's medical team, made a statement denying that the filmmaker had cancer. However, in late June he left Iran for treatment in a Paris hospital, where he died on 4 July 2016. The week before his death, Kiarostami had been invited to join the Academy Awards in Hollywood as part of efforts to increase the diversity of its judges. Ali Ahani, Iran's ambassador to France, stated that Kiarostami's body would be transferred to Iran to be buried at Behesht-e Zahra cemetery. However, it was later announced that his body would be buried in Lavasan, a resort town about 40 km (25 mi) northeast of Tehran, based on his own will, after it was flown back to Tehran from Paris. His body was returned to Tehran's Imam Khomeini International Airport on 8 July 2016, while a crowd of Iranian film directors, actors, actresses and other artists were in Tehran airport to pay their respects.

Mohammad Shirvani, a fellow filmmaker and close friend, quoted Kiarostami on his Facebook wall on 8 June 2016: "I do not believe I could stand and direct any more films. They [the medical team] destroyed it [his digestive system]." After this comment, a campaign was set up by Iranians on both Twitter and Facebook to investigate the possibility of medical error during Kiarostami's procedure. However, Ahmad Kiarostami, his eldest son, denied any medical error in his father's treatment after Shirvani's comment and said that his father's health was no cause for alarm. After Kiarostami's death, Head of the Iranian Medical Council Dr. Alireza Zali sent a letter to his French counterpart, Patrick Bouet, urging him to send Kiarostami's medical file to Iran for further investigation. Nine days after Kiarostami's death, on 13 July 2016, his family issued a formal complaint of medical maltreatment through Kiarostami's personal doctor. Dariush Mehrjui, another famous Iranian cinema director, also criticized the medical team that treated Kiarostami and demanded legal action.

=== Reactions ===
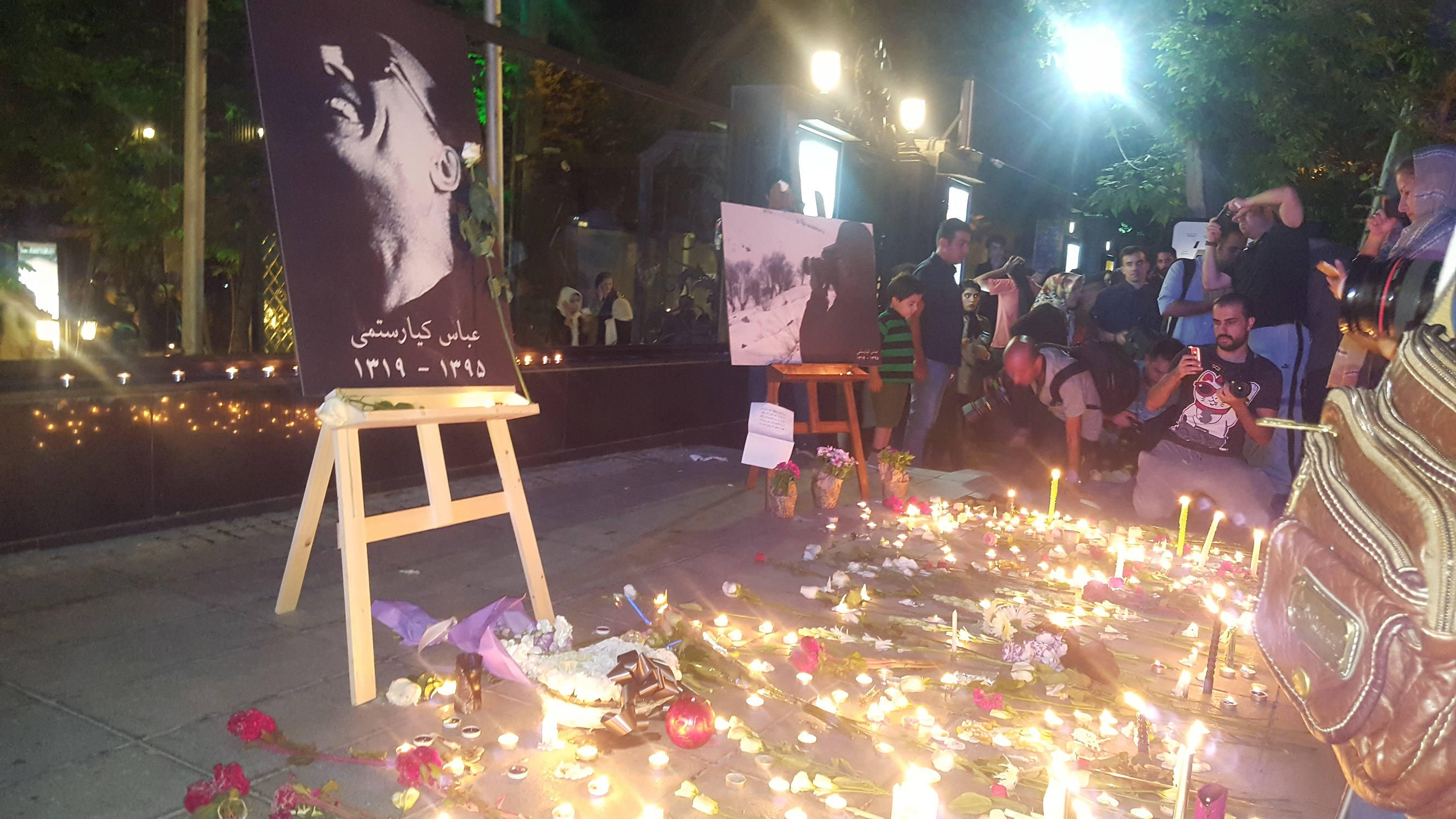
People place candles and flowers in memorial of Kiarostami at Tehran's Ferdows Garden (Cinema Museum)

Martin Scorsese said he was "deeply shocked and saddened" by the news. Oscar-winning Iranian film-maker Asghar Farhadi – who had been due to fly to Paris to visit his friend – said he was "very sad, in total shock". Mohsen Makhmalbaf echoed the sentiment, saying Iran's cinema owes its global reputation to his fellow director, but that this visibility did not translate into greater visibility for his work in his homeland. "Kiarostami gave the Iranian cinema the international credibility that it has today," he told The Guardian. "But his films were unfortunately not seen as much in Iran. He changed the world's cinema; he freshened it and humanized it in contrast with Hollywood's rough version." Persian mystic and poet Jalal al-Din Rumi's 22nd niece Esin Celebi also expressed her condolences over the demise of Kiarostami in a separate message. Iran's representative office at the United Nations Educational, Scientific and Cultural Organization, UNESCO also opened a memorial book for signature to honour Kiarostami.

Iranian President Hassan Rouhani said on Twitter that the director's "different and profound attitude towards life and his invitation to peace and friendship" would be a "lasting achievement". Foreign Minister Mohammad-Javad Zarif also said Kiarostami's death was a loss for international cinema. In a statement, French President François Hollande praised the director for forging "close artistic ties and deep friendships" with France.

Media, such as The New York Times, CNN, The Guardian, The Huffington Post, The Independent, Associated Press, Euronews and Le Monde, also reacted to Kiarostami's death. The New York Times wrote: "Abbas Kiarostami, Acclaimed Iranian Filmmaker, Dies at 76" and Peter Bradshaw paid tribute to Kiarostami: "a sophisticated, self-possessed master of cinematic poetry"

=== Funeral ===
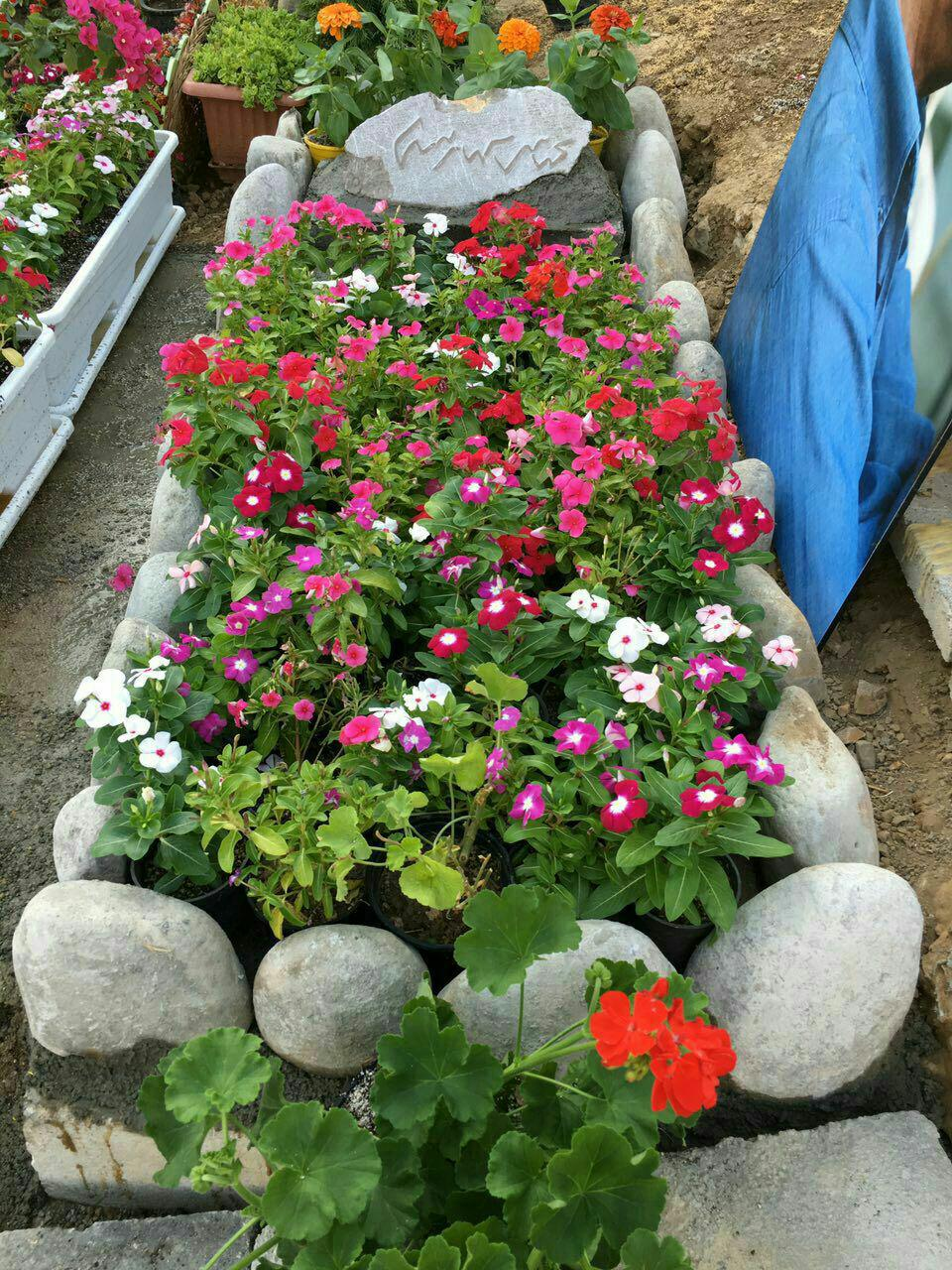
Kiarostami's grave at Lavasan

Artists, cultural authorities, government officials, and the Iranian people gathered to say goodbye to Kiarostami on 10 July in an emotional funeral, six days after his death in France. The ceremony was held at the Center for the Intellectual Education of Children, where he began his film-making career some 40 years before. Attendees held banners with the titles of his movies and pictures of his most famous posters, as they praised the support Kiarostami contributed to culture, and particularly to filmmaking in Iran. The ceremony was hosted by famous Iranian actor Parviz Parastooie, and included speeches by painter Aidin Aghdashlou and prize-winning film director Asghar Farhadi, who stressed his professional abilities. He was later buried in a private ceremony in the northern Tehran town of Lavasan.

== Sexual assault and plagiarism allegations ==
In August 2020, Mania Akbari, who starred in Ten, accused Kiarostami of plagiarism, stating that he edited private footage shot by Akbari into the film without her permission. In her 2019 short film Letter to My Mother, Amina Maher, daughter of Akbari, who also appeared in Ten, said that her scenes in Ten were filmed without her knowledge. In 2022, Akbari and Maher revealed that they had been asking distributor MK2 to halt circulation of the film, to which MK2 has yet to respond. Consequently, the British Film Institute removed Ten from a Kiarostami retrospective.

In 2022, Akbari accused Kiarostami of raping her twice, in Tehran when she was 25 and he was about 60, and in London after Ten had premiered.

== Reception and critique ==
Kiarostami has received worldwide acclaim for his work from both audiences and critics, and, in 1999, he was voted the most important Iranian film director of the 1990s by two international critics' polls. Four of his films were placed in the top six of Cinematheque Ontario's Best of the '90s poll. He has gained recognition from film theorists, critics, as well as peers such as Jean-Luc Godard, Nanni Moretti, and Chris Marker. Akira Kurosawa said of Kiarostami's films: "Words cannot describe my feelings about them ... When Satyajit Ray passed on, I was very depressed. But after seeing Kiarostami's films, I thanked God for giving us just the right person to take his place." Critically acclaimed directors such as Martin Scorsese have commented that "Kiarostami represents the highest level of artistry in the cinema." The Austrian director Michael Haneke had admired the work of Abbas Kiarostami as among the best of any living director. In 2006, The Guardian's panel of critics ranked Kiarostami as the best contemporary non-American film director.

Critics such as Jonathan Rosenbaum have argued that "there's no getting around the fact that the movies of Abbas Kiarostami divide audiences—in this country, in his native Iran, and everywhere else they're shown." Rosenbaum argues that disagreements and controversy over Kiarostami's movies have arisen from his style of film-making because what in Hollywood would count as essential narrative information is frequently missing from Kiarostami's films. Camera placement, likewise, often defies standard audience expectations: in the closing sequences of Life and Nothing More and Through the Olive Trees, the audience is forced to imagine the dialogue and circumstances of important scenes. In Homework and Close-Up, parts of the soundtrack are masked or silenced. Critics have argued that the subtlety of Kiarostami's cinematic expression is largely resistant to critical analysis.

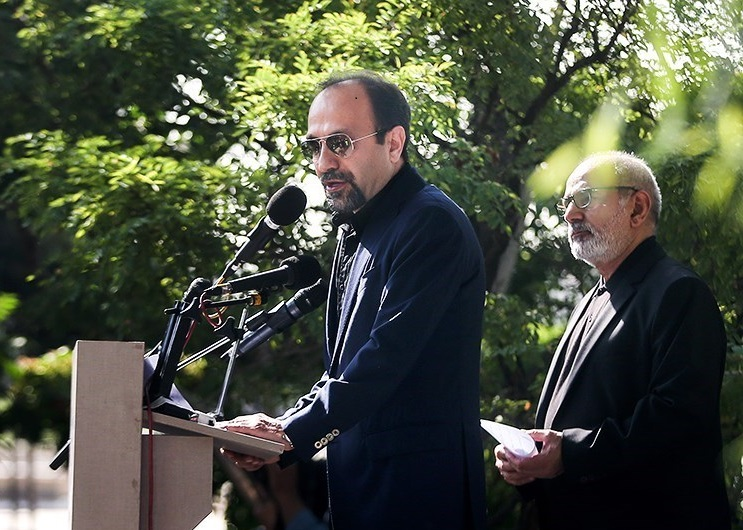
Iranian film director Asghar Farhadi speaking on Abbas Kiarostami's funeral, in Tehran, Iran

While Kiarostami has won significant acclaim in Europe for several of his films, the Iranian government has refused to permit the screening of his films, to which he responded "The government has decided not to show any of my films for the past 10 years... I think they don't understand my films and so prevent them being shown just in case there is a message they don't want to get out".

In the wake of the September 11 attacks, Kiarostami was refused a visa to attend the New York Film Festival. The festival director, Richard Peña, who had invited him said, "It's a terrible sign of what's happening in my country today that no one seems to realize or care about the kind of negative signal this sends out to the entire Muslim world". The Finnish film director Aki Kaurismäki boycotted the festival in protest. Kiarostami had been invited by the New York Film Festival, as well as Ohio University and Harvard University.

In 2005, London Film School organized a workshop as well as the festival of Kiarostami's work, titled "Abbas Kiarostami: Visions of the Artist". Ben Gibson, Director of the London Film School, said, "Very few people have the creative and intellectual clarity to invent cinema from its most basic elements, from the ground up. We are very lucky to have the chance to see a master like Kiarostami thinking on his feet." He was later made Honorary Associate.

In 2007, the Museum of Modern Art and MoMA PS1 co-organized a festival of the Kiarostami's work titled Abbas Kiarostami: Image Maker.

Kiarostami and his cinematic style have been the subject of several books and three films, Opening Day of Close-Up (1996), directed by Nanni Moretti, Abbas Kiarostami: The Art of Living (2003), directed by Pat Collins and Fergus Daly, and Abbas Kiarostami: A Report (2014), directed by Bahman Maghsoudlou.

Kiarostami was a member of the advisory board of World Cinema Foundation. Founded by the director Martin Scorsese, its goal is to find and reconstruct world cinema films that have been long neglected.

=== Selected honors and awards ===
Kiarostami has won the admiration of audiences and critics worldwide and received at least seventy awards up to the year 2000. Here are some representatives:

- Prix Roberto Rossellini (1992)
- Prix Cine Decouvertes (1992)
- François Truffaut Award (1993)
- Pier Paolo Pasolini Award (1995)
- Federico Fellini Gold Medal, UNESCO (1997)
- Palme d'Or, Cannes Film Festival (1997)
- Honorary Golden Alexander Prize, Thessaloniki International Film Festival (1999)
- Silver Lion, Venice Film Festival (1999)
- Akira Kurosawa Award (2000)
- honorary doctorate, École Normale Supérieure (2003)
- Konrad Wolf Prize (2003)
- Praemium Imperiale (2004)
- President of the Jury for Caméra d'Or Award, Cannes Festival (2005)
- Fellowship of the British Film Institute (2005)
- Gold Leopard of Honor, Locarno International Film Festival (2005)
- Prix Henri-Langlois Prize (2006)
- Honorary doctorate, University of Toulouse (2007)
- World's great masters, Kolkata International Film Festival (2007)
- Glory to the Filmmaker Award, Venice Film Festival (2008)
- Honorary doctorate, University of Paris (2010)
- Lifetime Achievement Award for Contribution to World Cinematography (BIAFF – Batumi International Art-house film Festival, 2010)
- Japan's Medal of Honor (2013)
- Austrian Decoration for Science and Art (2014)
- Honorary Golden Orange Prize, International Antalya Film Festival (2014)

== Filmography ==
=== Feature films ===
Year	Film	Director	Writer	Notes
1973	The Experience	Yes	Yes	written with Amir Naderi
1974	The Traveler	Yes	Yes	
1976	A Wedding Suit	Yes	Yes	written with Parviz Davayi
1977	The Report	Yes	Yes	
1979	First Case, Second Case	Yes	Yes	
1983	Fellow Citizen	Yes	Yes	documentary film
1984	First Graders	Yes	Yes	documentary film
1987	Where Is the Friend's House?	Yes	Yes	first film of the Koker trilogy
1987	The Key	No	Yes	
1989	Homework	Yes	Yes	documentary film
1990	Close-Up	Yes	Yes	docufiction film
1992	Life, and Nothing More...	Yes	Yes	second film of the Koker trilogy alternatively titled And Life Goes On in English
1994	Through the Olive Trees	Yes	Yes	third and final film of the Koker trilogy
1994	Safar	No	Yes	alternatively titled The Journey in English
1995	The White Balloon	No	Yes	
1997	Taste of Cherry	Yes	Yes	
1999	Willow and Wind	No	Yes	
1999	The Wind Will Carry Us	Yes	Yes	
2001	ABC Africa	Yes	Yes	documentary film
2002	The Deserted Station	No	No	story concept by Kiarostami
2002	Ten	Yes	Yes	docufiction film
2003	Crimson Gold	No	Yes	
2003	Five Dedicated to Ozu	Yes	Yes	documentary film alternatively titled Five
2004	10 on Ten	Yes	Yes	documentary film on Kiarostami's own films, especially Ten
2005	Tickets	Yes	Yes	directed with Ermanno Olmi and Ken Loach written with Ermanno Olmi and Paul Laverty
2006	Men at Work	No	No	initial story concept by Kiarostami
2006	Víctor Erice–Abbas Kiarostami: Correspondences	Yes	Yes	collaboration with noted director Víctor Erice also written and directed by Erice
2007	Persian Carpet	Yes	Yes	only the Is There a Place to Approach? segment one of 15 segments in Persian Carpet, in which each is by a different Iranian director
2008	Shirin	Yes	Yes	
2010	Certified Copy	Yes	Yes	
2012	Like Someone in Love	Yes	Yes	
2012	Meeting Leila	No	Yes	
2016	Final Exam	No	Yes	posthumous, story concept by Kiarostami before his passing also written by Adel Yaraghi, who directed
2017	24 Frames	Yes	Yes	

=== Short films ===
Year	Film	Director	Writer	Notes
1970	The Bread and Alley	Yes	Yes	
1972	Recess	Yes	Yes	
1975	Two Solutions for One Problem	Yes	Yes	
1975	So Can I	Yes	Yes	
1976	The Colours	Yes	Yes	
1977	Tribute to the Teachers	Yes	Yes	documentary
1977	Jahan-nama Palace	Yes	Yes	documentary
1977	How to Make Use of Leisure Time	Yes	Yes	
1978	Solution	Yes	Yes	also called Solution No.1 in English
1980	Toothache	Yes	Yes	
1980	Driver	No	Yes	
1980	Orderly or Disorderly	Yes	Yes	
1982	The Chorus	Yes	Yes	
1995	Solution	Yes	Yes	
1995	Abbas Kiarostami	Yes	Yes	segment from Lumière and Company
1997	The Birth of Light	Yes	Yes	
1999	Volte sempre, Abbas!	No	Yes	
2005	Roads of Kiarostami	Yes	Yes	
2007	Is There a Place to Approach?	Yes	Yes	one of 15 segments in Persian Carpet, in which each is by a different Iranian director
2013	The Girl in the Lemon Factory	No	Yes	also written by Chiara Maranon, who directed
2014	Seagull Eggs	Yes	Yes	documentary

== Books by Kiarostami ==
- Havres : French translation by Tayebeh Hashemi and Jean-Restom Nasser, ÉRÈS (PO&PSY); Bilingual edition (3 June 2010) ISBN 978-2-7492-1223-4.
- Abbas Kiarostami: Cahiers du Cinéma Livres (24 October 1997) ISBN 2-86642-196-5.
- Walking with the Wind (Voices and Visions in Film): English translation by Ahmad Karimi-Hakkak and Michael C. Beard, Harvard Film Archive; Bilingual edition (28 February 2002) ISBN 0-674-00844-8.
- 10 (ten): Cahiers du Cinéma Livres (5 September 2002) ISBN 2-86642-346-1.
- With Nahal Tajadod and Jean-Claude Carrière Avec le vent: P.O.L. (5 May 2002) ISBN 2-86744-889-1.
- Le vent nous emportera: Cahiers du Cinéma Livres (5 September 2002) ISBN 2-86642-347-X.
- La Lettre du Cinema: P.O.L. (12 December 1997) ISBN 2-86744-589-2.
- Kiarostami, Abbas, A Wolf on Watch (Persian / English dual language), English Translation by Iman Tavassoly and Paul Cronin, Sticking Place Books (2015)
- Kiarostami, Abbas, With the Wind (Persian / English dual language), English Translation by Iman Tavassoly and Paul Cronin, Sticking Place Books (2015)
- Kiarostami, Abbas, Wind and Leaf (Persian / English dual language), English Translation by Iman Tavassoly and Paul Cronin, Sticking Place Books (2015)
- Kiarostami, Abbas, Wine (poetry by Hafez) (Persian / English dual language), English Translation by Iman Tavassoly and Paul Cronin, Sticking Place Books (2015)
- Kiarostami, Abbas, Tears (poetry by Saadi) (Persian / English dual language), English Translation by Iman Tavassoly and Paul Cronin, Sticking Place Books (2015)
- Kiarostami, Abbas, Water (poetry by Nima) (Persian / English dual language), English Translation by Iman Tavassoly and Paul Cronin, Sticking Place Books (2015)
- Kiarostami, Abbas, Fire (poetry by Rumi) (four volumes) (Persian / English dual language), English Translation by Iman Tavassoly and Paul Cronin, Sticking Place Books (2016)
- Kiarostami, Abbas, Night: Poetry from the Contemporary Persian Canon (two volumes) (Persian / English Dual Language), English Translation by Iman Tavassoly and Paul Cronin, Sticking Place Books (2016)
- Kiarostami, Abbas, Night: Poetry from the Classical Persian Canon (two volumes) (Persian / English Dual Language), English Translation by Iman Tavassoly and Paul Cronin, Sticking Place Books (2016)
- Kiarostami, Abbas, In the Shadow of Trees: The Collected Poetry of Abbas Kiarostami, English Translation by Iman Tavassoly and Paul Cronin, Sticking Place Books (2016)
- Kiarostami, Abbas, Lessons with Kiarostami (edited by Paul Cronin), Sticking Place Books (2015)
- Mohammed Afkhami, Sussan Babaie, Venetia Porter, Natasha Morris. "Honar: The Afkhami Collection of Modern and Contemporary Iranian Art." Phaidon Press, 2017. ISBN 978-0-7148-7352-7.

== See also ==
- Cinema of Iran

== Bibliography ==
- Geoff Andrew, Ten (London: BFI Publishing, 2005)
- Erice-Kiarostami. Correspondences, 2006, ISBN 84-96540-24-3, catalogue of an exhibition together with the Spanish filmmaker Víctor Erice
- Alberto Elena, The Cinema of Abbas Kiarostami, Saqi Books 2005, ISBN 0-86356-594-8,
- Mehrnaz Saeed-Vafa, Jonathan Rosenbaum, Abbas Kiarostami (Contemporary Film Directors), University of Illinois Press 2003 (paperback), ISBN 0-252-07111-5
- Julian Rice, Abbas Kiarostami's Cinema of Life, Rowman & Littlefield 2020, ISBN 978-1-5381-3700-0
- Jean-Luc Nancy, The Evidence of Film – Abbas Kiarostami, Yves Gevaert, Belgium 2001, ISBN 2-930128-17-8
- Jean-Claude Bernardet, Caminhos de Kiarostami, Melhoramentos; 1 edition (2004), ISBN 978-85-359-0571-7
- Marco Dalla Gassa, Abbas Kiarostami, Publisher: Mani (2000) ISBN 978-88-8012-147-3
- Youssef Ishaghpour, Le réel, face et pile: Le cinéma d'Abbas Kiarostami, Farrago (2000) ISBN 978-2-84490-063-0
- Alberto Barbera and Elisa Resegotti (editors), Kiarostami, Electa (30 April 2004) ISBN 978-88-370-2390-4
- Laurent Kretzschmar, "Is Cinema Renewing Itself?", Film-Philosophy. vol. 6 no 15, July 2002.
- Jonathan Rosenbaum, "Lessons from a Master," Chicago Reader, 14 June 1996
- Tanya Shilina-Conte, "Abbas Kiarostami's 'Lessons of Darkness:’ Affect, Non-Representation, and Becoming-Imperceptible". Special Issue on "Abbas Kiarostami". Iran Namag, A Quarterly of Iranian Studies 2, no. 4 (Winter 2017/2018), University of Toronto, Canada
- Silke von Berswordt-Wallrabe et al. (eds.): Abbas Kiarostami. Images, Still and Moving, exh. cat. Situation Kunst Bochum, Museum Wiesbaden, Kunstsammlungen Chemnitz (Ostfildern: Hatje Cantz, 2012), ISBN 978-3-7757-3436-3
- Andreas Kramer, Jan Röhnert (ed.), Poetry and Film / Lyrik und Film. Abbas Kiarostami and / und Jim Jarmusch, Frankfurt am Main 2020
- Godfrey Cheshire, Conversations With Kiarostami, Woodville Press, New York, 2019ISBN 978-0-9994683-5-7
- Godfrey Cheshire, In The Time Of Kiarostami: Writings On Iranian Cinema, Woodville Press, New York, 2022. ISBN 979-8-9864463-0-1
