= List of Iranian films =

A list of films produced in Iran ordered by year of release. For an alphabetical list of Iranian films see Category:Iranian films.

- List of Iranian films before 1960
- List of Iranian films of the 1960s
- List of Iranian films of the 1970s
- List of Iranian films of the 1980s
- List of Iranian films of the 1990s
- List of Iranian films of the 2000s
- List of Iranian films of the 2010s
- List of Iranian films of the 2020s
