= Karl Riedl =

German film editor based in Berlin

- Born: Kloster Indersdorf, Bavaria, Germany
- Occupation: Film editor

Karl Riedl is a German film editor based in Berlin. The films he worked on have been granted multiple awards at major film festivals including Rotterdam, Berlin, Cannes, Venice, New York, Sundance, Tokyo and Montreal among others. A selection of awards he received includes: the Tiger Award from the International Film Festival Rotterdam in 2000 for Suzhou River; the Silver Bear for Best Artistic Achievement at the Berlin International Film Festival and Best Narrative Feature Film at Tribeca Film Festival in New York in 2003 for Blind Shaft; and Best Actress and Economical Prize at the Montreal World Film Festival in 2012 for Closed Season.

His years working together with video artists resulted in shows at the Museum Boijmans van Beuningen in Rotterdam and Art Basel. A vital component of his work is his collaboration with independent Chinese filmmakers, which led to production of Buddha Mountain in 2010, the first arthouse box office success in China. In addition, he has been holding guest lectures at Karlsruhe University of Arts and Design.

== Filmography ==
- 1998 Signalstörung (directed by Thomas Mank)
- 2000 Suzhou River (directed by Lou Ye)
- 2000 Conspiracy Spray (directed by Ine Lamers)
- 2002 1 or 2 things I know about Chisinau (directed by Ine Lamers)
- 2003 Blind Shaft (directed by Li Yang)
- 2004 Not She (directed by Ine Lamers)
- 2005 Dam Street (directed by Li Yu)
- 2005 Into Great Silence (directed by Philip Gröning)
- 2006 Bridging the Gap (directed by Ciro Cappellari)
- 2007 Lost in Beijing (directed by Li Yu)
- 2007 Songs from the Southern Seas (directed by Marat Sarulu)
- 2008 Armee der Stille - La Isla Bonita (directed by Roland Lang)
- 2009 Spring Fever (directed by Lou Ye)
- 2009 In Berlin (directed by Ciro Cappellari & Michael Ballhaus)
- 2010 Buddha Mountain (directed by Li Yu)
- 2011 Blind Date (directed by Isabell Heimerdinger)
- 2012 Closed Season (directed by Franziska Schlotterer)
- 2013 The Police Officer's Wife (directed by Philip Gröning)
- 2014 Factory Boss (directed by Zhang Wei)
- 2015 The Spiderwebhouse (directed by Mara Eibl-Eibesfeldt)
- 2015 Jesus Cries (directed by Brigitte Maria Mayer)
- 2017 The Swim (directed by He Xiangyu)
- 2018 The Rib (directed by Zhang Wei)
- 2018 Good Girl Gone Bad (directed by Petra Lüschow)
- 2019 The River in Me (directed by Ke Yongquan, Yang Zhichun, He Yuan)
- 2022 House of Nations (directed by He Xiangyu)
- 2025 The Radiant Screen (directed by Ine Lamers)
