= Peyman Yazdanian =

Iranian pianist and music composer (born 1968)

Peyman Yazdanian (Persian: پیمان یزدانیان, born in 1968) is an Iranian pianist and music composer. He has written over forty pieces for solo piano and has composed for both national and foreign feature films. He wrote original soundtracks for plays and multimedia.

== Early life ==
He was trained by pianist Farman Behboud. He attended the courses of Gerhard Geretschlaeger in Vienna and Ginette Gaubert in Marseille. In conducting, he studied under Iradj Sahbai in Strasbourg.

== Career ==
As a pianist-interpreter, he won first prize in the competition of excellence at the Musical Confederation of France in 2000. He is recognized for his interpretations of works by Rachmaninov, Liszt, Beethoven, and Chopin.

In 1998, he began writing film music for the Iranian director Abbas Kiarostami's The Wind Will Carry Us.

Peyman Yazdanian composed the music for Summer Palace by Chinese filmmaker Lou Ye, a film selected for the Cannes Film Festival in 2006. He composes for Iranian film makers, such as One Night for Niki Karimi (2005) or Fire Party for Asghar Farhadi (2006), but also contributes to French-Italian productions (The Forbidden Chapter in 2006), German productions (Full Metal Village, best documentary at the Guild of German Art House Cinemas in 2007) or American productions such as Man Push Cart (selected at the Sundance Film Festival).

Peyman Yazdanian writes music for the theater as well as solo piano works. He is the creator of a new form of expressionism based on Persian motifs and oriental accents. He is currently preparing the recording of his work A Tea Collection for String Ensemble, dedicated to the benefits of tea, by the London Symphonic Orchestra.

== Soundtracks ==
Films for which he has composed music include:

- 1998 - Birth of Light, by Abbas Kiarostami (Iran)
- 1998 - The Turtle (Lakposht), by Ali Shah-Hatami (Iran)
- 2000 - The Strangers (Biganegan), by Ramin Bahrani (Iran - US)
- 2000 - The Wind Will Carry Us (Bad ma ra khahad bord), by Abbas Kiarostami (Iran - France)
- 2001 - Going By (Az Kenar-e Ham Migozarim), by Iraj Karimi (Iran)
- 2001 - Water and Fire (Ab o Atash), by Fereydoun Jayrani (Iran)
- 2002 - Bright Nights (Shabhaye Roshan), by Farzad Motamen (Iran)
- 2002 - And Along Came a Spider, by Maziar Bahari (Iran)
- 2002 - The Little Bird Boy (Parandebaze Koochak), by Rahbar Ghanbari (Iran)
- 2002 - The Deserted Station (Istgahe Matrook), by Alireza Raisain (Iran)
- 2003 - Sometimes Look at the Sky (Gahi be asman negah kon), by Kamal Tabrizi (Iran)
- 2003 - The Wind Carpet (Farshe Baad), by Kamal Tabrizi (Iran - Japan)
- 2003 - Crimson Gold (Talaye sorkh), by Jafar Panahi (Iran)
- 2004 - The Tradition of Lover Killing (Rasme Ashegh Koshi), by Khosro Masumi (Iran)
- 2004 - The Soldiers of Friday (Sarbazane Jom'e), by Massoud Kimiai (Iran)
- 2004 - The Fatherhood Field (Mazra'aye Pedari), by Rasool Mollagholipour (Iran)
- 2004 - The Picture of a Lady From Faraway (Simaye zani dar door dast), by Ali Mosaffa (Iran)
- 2005 - One Night (Yek shab), by Niki Karimi (Iran - France)
- 2005 - La Fine Del Mare, by Nora Hoppe (Germany - France)
- 2005 - The Forbidden Chapter, by Fariborz Kamkari (France - Italy)
- 2005 - Man Push Cart, by Ramin Bahrani (USA)
- 2005 - A Piece of Bread (Yek Tekke Nan), by Kamal Tabrizi (Iran)
- 2006 - Full Metal Village, by Sung Hyung Cho (Germany)
- 2006 - Few Days Later (Chand rooze ba'ad), by Niki Karimi (Iran)
- 2006 - A Place in Far Distance (Djayee dar door dast), by Khosro Masumi (Iran)
- 2006 - The Fire Festival (Charshanbeh suri), by Asghar Farhadi (Iran)
- 2006 - Summer Palace (Une Jeunesse Chinoise), by Lou Ye (China - France)
- 2007 - Awards for Silence (Padash-e sokut), by Maziar Miri (Iran)
- 2007 - Lost in Beijing (苹果), by Li Yu (China)
- 2008 - Yousef the Prophet (yousef-e piambar), by Farajollah Salahshour (Iran)
- 2009 - Awards (Padash), by Kamal Tabrizi (Iran)
- 2009 - Spring Fever, by Lou Ye (China)
- 2010 - Alchemy and Dust (Kimia va Khak), by Abbass Rafeyee (Iran)
- 2010 - Buddha Mountain, by Li Yu (China)
- 2017 - A Man of Integrity (Lerd), by Mohammad Rasoulof (Iran)
- 2018 - Tale of the Sea
- 2018 - English, by Joan Chen (China)
- 2018 - Frontline
- 2019 - Labyrinth
- 2019 - Single Cycle
- 2019 - Just 6.5 (متری شیش و نیم), by Saeed Roustayi (Iran)
- 2019 - Balloon (气球), by Pema Tseden (China)
- 2020 - Radiography of a Family, [archive] by Firouzeh Khosrovani [archive]
- 2022 - Return to Dust (隐入尘烟) by Li Ruijun

Yazdanian wrote music for Prophet Joseph, an Iranian TV Show directed by Farajollah Salahshoor.

== Discography ==
- 2001 – Themes, Hermes Records [archive]
- 2003 – Iradj Sahbai, Igor Stravinsky, Kargah-e Musiqi [archive]
- 2003 – Goosh 1, Mahriz-e Mehr
- 2004 – Second Take, Hermes Records [archive]
- 2005 – La Muerte del Angel, Ahange Parsian
- 2005 – Crossing, Hermes Records [archive]
- 2008 – Clouds,
- 2008 – On the Wind, Hermes Records [archive]
- 2010 – Suites, Hermes Records [archive]
- 2016 - Tame, Hermes Records [archive]
- 2020 - Pulse, Hermes Records [archive]
- از انعکاس شهرهای دور = Echoes From Distant Lands (CD, Album) [archive]
- ? – Morceaux choisis, Ohrwurm

== Works ==
Piano Compositions More than 40 pieces for solo piano including 4 preludes, 2 fantasies, 1 ballad, 1 barcarolle, 5 suites and a few pieces in free style.

Orchestral Compositions A Tea Collection for A String Ensemble in six movements. (2007)

Piano Recordings Played and recorded 3 Inventions, Un homage de Ravel and 15 traditional voices for piano by Irajd Sahbai in a CD published by Kargah Musiqi. (2003)

Played and recorded a piece named "Eghbal" by Mohammad Reza Darvishi published in the "Goosh" series by Mahriz publishing company. (2003)

Music for plays The original soundtrack for the play For a More Important Thing, based on the story Hope For the Flowers, directed by Sheyda Safavi, Iran 1998

Music for multimedia The original soundtrack for Negah Multimedia CD-ROM, Cinema ’76, Iran 1997 The original soundtrack for Negah Multimedia CD-ROM, Footballopedia ’98, Iran 1998 The original soundtrack for Multimedia CD-ROM Kish ‘77, produced by Kish Free Zone Organization, Iran 1998 The original soundtrack for Negah Multimedia CD-ROM, Art Gallery, Iran 2001
