= Dam Street =

- Film poster
- Traditional Chinese: 紅顏
- Simplified Chinese: 红颜
- Hanyu Pinyin: Hóng yán
- Directed by: Li Yu
- Written by: Fang Li; Li Yu
- Produced by: Fang Li; Sylvain Bursztejn
- Starring: Liu Yi; Huang Xingrao
- Cinematography: Wang Wei
- Edited by: Karl Riedl
- Music by: Liu Sijun
- Production companies: Laurel Films; Rosem Films; Fonds Sud Cinema
- Distributed by: Bavaria Film International
- Release dates: September 8, 2005 (Venice); January 17, 2007
- Running time: 93 minutes
- Language: Mandarin

Dam Street (Chinese: 红颜; lit. 'Rouge face') is a 2005 Chinese film directed by Li Yu. Dam Street is Li's second feature film, after 2001's Fish and Elephant and was produced by screenwriter Fang Li's Laurel Films and Sylvain Bursztejn's French company, Rosem Films.

Dam Street, shot mainly in Sichuanese Mandarin, follows the life of a young woman, Xiaoyun in a corner of China's central Sichuan province. The film premiered at the 2005 Venice Film Festival on September 8, and also received a handful of other showings at other festivals, notably Toronto (2005) and Deauville (2006).

Lead actress Liu Yi is a notable Sichuan opera actress (Plum Blossom Award, 2007).

== Story ==
Dam Street tells the story of Xiaoyun, a sixteen-year-old girl in Sichuan who discovers that she has become pregnant, shocking her family and community. When the school discovers the scandal, Xiaoyun and her boyfriend, Wang Feng are expelled, with Wang Feng being sent to a vocational school in another city. Xiaoyun, meanwhile, is screamed at by her mother, a teacher at the high school, and her boyfriend's elder sister Wang Zhengyue, a nurse who also helps deliver her child.

Together, the mother and sister lie to Xiaoyun, claiming the child died in birth, while actually arranging for his adoption across the river. Ten years later, Xiaoyun's life is at a standstill in the same small town. She makes a meager living as a singer in a local troupe but otherwise has never left. Eventually she strikes up a friendship with a ten-year-old boy, Xiao Yong who becomes her closest confidante and defender in the community that scorns her.

== Cast ==
- Liu Yi as Liu Xiaoyun, the film's heroine, a young girl who due to an unforeseen pregnancy sees her life go off-track.
- Huang Xingrao as Xiao Yong, a ten-year-old boy who befriends Xiaoyun.
- Li Kechun as Su Yunwen, Xiaoyun's mother, a teacher at the school.
- Liu Rui as Wang Feng, Xiaoyun's high school boyfriend.
- Wang Yizhu as Wang Zhengyue, Wang Feng's elder sister, a nurse.

== Reception ==
The film, the second by mainland helmer Li Yu, was shown to only a handful of audiences, though it did receive a limited screening in New York, 2007, two years after its premiere in Venice. Critics like Derek Elley of Variety placed the film in the same vein of other European-inspired Chinese films such as Wang Chao's Day and Night and Wang Xiaoshuai's Shanghai Dreams (the latter of which takes place in roughly the same time period of the 1980s); a movement highlighted by muted emotional palettes. At the same time, however, Elley found that the muted emotion went too far, resulting in a film that lacked "dramatic heft."

Manohla Dargis of The New York Times reviewed the film when it was part of the Museum of Modern Art's Global Lens 2007 series. She noted primarily the film's grim outlook on post-Mao alienation, though she also paid special attention to the film's unique comments on sexual politics.

=== Awards and nominations ===
- Venice Film Festival, 2005
  - C.I.C.A.E. Award
- Flanders International Film Festival, 2005
  - Best Director, Li Yu
- Golden Rooster Awards, 2005
  - Best Supporting Actress, Li Kechun (nominated)
- Deauville Asian Film Festival, 2006
  - Lotus du Meilleur Film
