= Abbas Kiarostami filmography =

Abbas Kiarostami was an Iranian film director, screenwriter, poet, photographer and film producer whose filmmaking career spanned more than 40 years.

== Films ==
Year	English title	Original title	Length	Notes
1970	The Bread and Alley	Nān o Kūcheh	10 minutes	Short (debut) featuring a school boy facing an aggressive dog
1972	Breaktime	Zang-e Tafrih	11 minutes	Short
1973	The Experience	Tajrobeh	60 minutes	Written with Amir Naderi
1974	The Traveler	Mosafer	70 minutes	Realism and complexity versus simplicity
1975	So Can I	Man ham Mitounam	3 minutes	Short
1975	Two Solutions for One Problem	Do Rahehal Baraye yek Masaleh	4 minutes	Short
1976	Colors	Rang-ha	15 minutes	Short
1976	A Wedding Suit	Lebasi Baraye Arossi	57 minutes	Themes of teenage conflict
1977	How to Make Use of Leisure Time: Painting	Az Oghat-e Faraghat-e Khod Chegouneh Estefadeh Konim: naghashi	7 minutes	Short
1977	The Report	Gozaresh	112 minutes	Kiarostami's first full-length film, featuring Academy Award-nominated actress Shohreh Aghdashloo.
1977	Tribute to the Teachers	Bozorgdasht-e Moalemha	20 minutes	Short
1978	Solution	Rah-e Hal	11 minutes 55	Short
1979	First Case, Second Case	Ghazieh-e Shekl-e Aval, Ghazieh-e Shekl-e Dovom	53 minutes	
1980	Toothache	Dandan Dard	26 minutes	Short
1981	Orderly or Disorderly	Be Tartib Ya Bedun-e Tartib	15 minutes	Short
1982	The Chorus	Hamsarayan	17 minutes	Short
1983	Fellow Citizen	Hamshahri	52 minutes	Documentary
1984	First Graders	Avaliha	84 minutes	Documentary
1987	Where Is My Friend's House?	Khane-ye doust kodjast?	83 minutes	Award win at the Locarno International Film Festival
1987	The Key	Kelid	85 minutes	Screenwriter and editor only
1989	Homework	Mashgh-e Shab	86 minutes	
1990	Close-up	Nema-ye Nazdik	100 minutes	In the 2012 Sight & Sound poll, it was voted by critics onto "The Top 50 Greatest Films of All Time" list.
1992	Life, and Nothing More...	Zendegi va digar hich	95 minutes	Fiction/documentary
1993	Journey to the Land of the Traveller	Safari be Diare Mosafer		Producer only. Directed by his son Bahman Kiarostami
1994	Through the Olive Trees	Zire darakhatan zeyton	103 minutes	Last in the Koker trilogy set around the Tehran earthquake
1994	The Journey	Safar	84 minutes	Screenwriter only. Directed by Ali-Reza Raisian
1995	The White Balloon	Badkonake sefid	85 minutes	Screenwriter only. Directed by Jafar Panahi
1995	A propos de Nice, la suite			Segment Reperages, codirected with Parviz Kimiavi
1995	Lumiere and Company			Segment Dinner for One
1997	The Birth of Light			Short
1997	Taste of Cherry	Ta'm-e gilass	95 minutes	Starring Homayon Ershadi. Won the Palme d'Or at the Cannes Film Festival
1999	The Wind Will Carry Us	Bād mā rā khāhad bord	118 minutes	Golden Lion nomination at Venice
1999	Willow and Wind			Screenwriter only.
2001	ABC Africa		84 minutes	Documentary that was taped in Kampala, Uganda on behalf of the UN
2002	Ten	Dah	89 minutes	Taped using a dashboard video camera Made $105,656 on US release
2002	The Deserted Station			Story only
2003	Crimson Gold	Talaye Sorkh		Screenwriter only. Directed by Jafar Panahi
2003	Five	Panj	74 minutes	
2003	Ten Minutes Older			Not included in Ten Minutes Older: The Trumpet or Ten Minutes Older: The Cello
2004	10 on Ten		88 minutes	Documentary
2005	Tickets		109 minutes	Middle section. Directed with Ken Loach and Ermanno Olmi
2005	The Roads of Kiarostami		32 minutes	Documentary short
2006	Rug		6 minutes	Short
2007	Kojast jaye residan			Documentary short
2007	To Each His Own Cinema		100 minutes	Segment Where Is My Romeo?
2008	Shirin		90 minutes	
2010	Certified Copy	Copie conforme	106 minutes	Juliette Binoche won the Best Actress Award at Cannes.
2010	No		8 minutes	Short
2012	Like Someone in Love	ライク・サムワン・イン・ラブ	109 minutes	Japanese film starring Rin Takanashi.
2013	Venice 70: Future Reloaded		1 minute	Untitled segment, which gives tribute to the Lumière brothers' L'Arroseur Arrosé
2016	Take Me Home		16 minutes	Short
2017	24 Frames		114 minutes	Posthumously released

== See also ==
- Persian cinema
- List of Iranian films
