= Great Silence =

Great Silence may refer to:

- The Great Silence observed by monastics after Compline during the hours of night
- Into Great Silence, a 2005 documentary film by Philip Gröning on the Order of Carthusians
- The Fermi paradox (astronomy); also referred to as the silencium universi or silentium universi
- The Great Silence, a film/western by Sergio Corbucci
