= Inside Südkorea – Staatskrise im Schatten von Nordkorea und China =

German documentary film

Inside Südkorea – Staatskrise im Schatten von Nordkorea und China (German for 'Inside South Korea: State Crisis in the Shadow of North Korea and China') is a 2025 documentary film produced by Yaena Kwon, Angela Claren-Moringen, Tommy Choi and Keith Park for the German political affairs television channel Phoenix, a joint operation between the public broadcasters ARD and ZDF. The documentary explores the December 2024 South Korean martial law and the political crisis that followed. However, the documentary was heavily criticised for alleged far-right bias and for presenting a one-sided portrayal of the political situation in South Korea, favouring the now-impeached President Yoon Suk Yeol in the process.

Phoenix originally scheduled the documentary to be broadcast on 6 March 2025. However, following widespread criticism and complaints from viewers, the planned broadcast on the linear TV channel was cancelled, and it was pulled from online platforms by 8 March 2025.

== Plot ==
The documentary features interviews with far-right figures such as Uh Dong-gyun, Jeon Kwang-hoon and former U.S. Colonel David S. Maxwell, who assert the unproven claims that North Korea and China are working to undermine the democracy in South Korea.

It features Eric J. Ballbach, the expert on the Korean Peninsula from the German Institute for International and Security Affairs (SWP), as the only person with the view against such conspiracy theory. When asked by Der Spiegel magazine, the SWP's communication department expressed the Institute's disappointment, stating that the documentary is 'highly biased and uncritical, both in the selection of information and in some of the interviewees'.

== Release and cancelled broadcast ==
Phoenix originally scheduled Inside Südkorea to be aired on 6 March 2025; ahead of its scheduled broadcast, the documentary was released on the channel's website, as well as on ARD Mediathek and ZDF Mediathek (the online video on demand and streaming services of ARD and ZDF, respectively) on 25 February.

However, following complaints and concerns over journalistic standards, Phoenix re-examined the documentary, and by 8 March 2025, it was pulled from the channel's website, ARD Mediathek and ZDF Mediathek. Its originally scheduled airing on 6 March was replaced with a documentary about Donald Trump. The review concluded that Inside Südkorea ignored the complexity of the political situation in South Korea, and does not meet the channel's journalistic standards. The response to the inquiry from Der Spiegel was that the documentary was 'intended to shed light on the previously less reported perspective of the conservative [People Power Party (PPP)] around the suspended head of state Yoon', but it 'failed to do so with the necessary balance'.

The Koreanische Demokratische Bürgerinitiative in Deutschland (lit. 'Korean Democratic Citizen's Initiative in Germany') pointed out that the documentary was still spreading on YouTube, and demanded Phoenix to request the Google-owned video hosting platform to remove the videos that use portions from the documentary, and attached the list of such videos and 3,515 autographs; Phoenix accepted the demand, and requested YouTube to remove the videos in question on the grounds of copyright infringement; the request was granted by 17 March 2025.

== Reception ==
=== Within South Korea and among ethnic Koreans ===
The documentary sparked significant controversy, particularly within South Korea. On 6 March 2025, the Network for Freedom of Expression Against Hatred and Censorship (a.k.a. Article 21 Net; a coalition of 16 human rights and freedom of press groups in South Korea) issued a statement, noting that the documentary 'revived the stereotypes that Europe had about East Asia during the Cold War era'.

An ethnic Korean group of the organisers of anti-Yoon protests in Germany gathered 2,195 autographs for a letter of complaint they sent to the broadcasters in question on 7 March 2025; in the letter, the group protested that 'most of the interviewees are the figures close to the President Yoon Suk Yeol, and [the producers] did not even do a little fact-check on their claims'.

In an interview with Die Tageszeitung, documentary filmmaker Cho Sung-hyung (who was born in South Korea and is based in Germany) expressed her concern that far-righters in South Korea are 'already actively exploiting' the documentary, and that, within that group, it serves as an alleged proof that the general public in Germany is against Yoon's impeachment.

=== South Korean government and politicians ===
Neither the South Korean Ministry of Foreign Affairs nor the Embassy in Germany initially took any action regarding the documentary. However, by 7 March 2025, the South Korean Embassy reportedly began the discussion on the matter, and reported the controversy to the Foreign Ministry.

On 11 March 2025, during the question time held by the South Korean National Assembly's Foreign Affairs and Reunification Committee, lawmakers from The Democratic Party of Korea (the opposition with majority seats) complained that the Foreign Ministry's response was lukewarm when the documentary is spreading disinformation that the [Democratic Party] is a 'pro-China and pro-North Korea judicial cartel', and made a comparison to the Ministry's response from 2024 when a Czech media criticised Yoon Suk Yeol's First Lady Kim Keon-hee. Foreign Minister Cho Tae-yul responded that '[the Czech media's criticism] was a personal attack against the First Lady, and [Inside Südkorea] is a report from a public broadcaster about the political situation [inside South Korea]'. A lawmaker from the ruling minority People Power Party (PPP; of which the President Yoon is a member) defended the documentary, saying that 'For foreigners, it will be hard to understand that [President Yoon] declared the martial law which was then lifted, and he was impeached; but then, [his] domestic approval ratings went higher, and those against [his] impeachment are protesting in the streets; and the German public broadcaster was exploring why'.
