= Buddha Mountain (film) =

- Film poster
- Directed by: Li Yu
- Written by: Li Yu; Fang Li
- Produced by: Fang Li; Peggy Chiao
- Starring: Sylvia Chang; Fan Bingbing; Chen Bolin
- Cinematography: Zeng Jian
- Edited by: Zeng Jian; Karl Riedl
- Music by: Peyman Yazdanian
- Production companies: Laurel Films; Huaxing Real Estate
- Distributed by: Golden Scene
- Release dates: October 24, 2010 (Tokyo Film Festival); March 4, 2011 (China)
- Running time: 104 minutes
- Country: China
- Language: Mandarin
- Box office: 70 million RMB

Buddha Mountain is a 2010 drama film directed by Li Yu and starring Sylvia Chang, Fan Bingbing and Chen Bolin. It was produced by Laurel Films, a small independent production company owned by Fang Li and based in Beijing. Laurel Films also produced Li Yu's previous film Lost in Beijing.

This film chronicles the lives of three youths who have no intention of sitting exams and getting into universities and a retired Chinese opera singer who is mourning the death of her son. The film explores themes of teenage confusion, angst, and rebellion and the impermanence of life.

== Plot ==
When singing onstage at a pub, Nan Feng (Fan Bingbing) hits a man in the crotch as she swings a speaker around, creating tension between her and the pub owner. Following this Nan Feng, her friends Ding Bo (Chen Bolin), and Fatso eat and drink by the roadside.

The next day, Fatso is bullied by a group of teenagers, and Nan Feng confronts them, smashing a bottle over her head and forcing another girl to kiss her.

Eventually, Nan Feng, Ding Bo, and Fatso decide to live with a woman named Teacher Chang, who has recently lost her son. The man who was injured by Nan Feng demands compensation. To pay for this, they take money from Miss Chang and replace it with paper money that is meant to be burnt for their ancestors.

Nan Feng, Ding Bo, and Fatso repair the car in which Teacher Chang's son died whilst on the way to a birthday meal with his girlfriend. On a trip in this car, they stop at a destroyed building. A flashback sequence reveals that this building was destroyed by the 2008 Sichuan earthquake. They take a picture with the help of a monk, standing in the ruins of the Buddha temple.

Nan Feng sees Ding Bo kissing another girl at a night-club and grows jealous. She returns to Teacher Chang for comfort. By day, Nan Feng, Ding Bo, Fatso and Teacher Chang go to the destroyed Buddha temple where they help with repairs and hang a bell. During the evening, they share a conversation where the monk reveals that his master's body is the real temple. Teacher Chang says she has done all she has to do and has no regrets, after happily knowing Nan Feng and the others have mended their personal lives

The next morning, Nan Feng and his friends seek Teacher Chang, but find her standing on the opposite cliff top. Nan Feng looks down to see a train passing by and, when she raises her head, she finds Teacher Chang has disappeared. The trio believe Teacher Chang has jumped off the cliff to reunite with her husband and son.

Fatso, Nan Feng and Ding Bo (who are now dating) take a train and ride home, where they realise their youth is slowly coming to an end and must slowly accept adulthood. Nan Feng is reminded of Teacher Chang’s words: “Loneliness is not forever, but being together is”, as the film ends.

== Awards ==
Year	Group	Award	Result
2010	23rd Tokyo International Film Festival	Tokyo Grand Prix	Nominated
2010	23rd Tokyo International Film Festival	Best Actress – Fan Bingbing	Won
2010	23rd Tokyo International Film Festival	Best Artistic Contribution – Li Yu	Won
2011	Casa Asia Film Week	Best Film	Won
2011	18th Beijing College Student Film Festival	Best Actress – Fan Bingbing	Won

== Alternate versions ==
This film's release in China consisted of a version different from the version seen at Tokyo International Film Festival. The deleted content include the forced demolitions and the beginning scenes (Sylvia Chang's role originally, was at the beginning of the film. She had an appearance during a scene in the Beijing Opera Troupe but her position in the troupe is replaced by another actor, so she was frustrated when the three youngsters first meet her. This clip is deleted so the role of teacher chang could be more complete). Director Li Yu stated that the deletion was not the request of the State Administration of Radio, Film, and Television, instead, it was simply to make the whole movie rhythm better and overall narrative smoother.

== Reception ==
The film received generally positive reviews from critics. The film was a financial success, with a domestic gross of more than 70 million RMB. The Hollywood Reporter criticized this film could easily have been a rote, melodramatic weeper but is saved from that fate by some astute writing, strong performances and an almost utter dearth of expected devices and although there are jumps in the growth of the characters, it's hard to find serious fault when the film has such an intense veracity otherwise. The Variety wrote younger thesps also impress, particularly Fan, who makes Nan Feng both childlike and fearsome. Chen's Ding Bo is less detailed, but scenes with the character's father (producer/co-writer Fang Li) give the thesp opportunity to explore greater emotional depths.
