= Ever Since We Love =

- Theatrical poster
- Simplified Chinese: 万物生长
- Hanyu Pinyin: Wàn Wù Shēngzhǎng
- Directed by: Li Yu
- Screenplay by: Wei Junzi; Li Yu
- Based on: Everything Grows by Feng Tang
- Produced by: Fang Li; Lu Jinbo
- Starring: Fan Bingbing; Han Geng
- Cinematography: Zeng Jian
- Edited by: Zeng Jian; Ze Yuan; Wang Yuye
- Music by: Howie B Takeshi Kobayashi
- Production companies: Laurel Films; Guomai Culture & Media; Union Pictures
- Release date: April 17, 2015 (China)
- Running time: 106 minutes
- Country: China
- Language: Mandarin
- Box office: US$23.6 million (China)

Ever Since We Love is a 2015 Chinese film directed by Li Yu based on one of the stories in the 2001 Chinese novel Everything Grows by Feng Tang (the Chinese title is the same as the novel). The film was released on April 17, 2015.

Like Li Yu's past 3 films since 2007, Fan Bingbing is cast as the main lead.

== Cast ==
- Fan Bingbing - Liu Qing (柳 青 Liǔ Qīng)
- Han Geng - Qiu Shui (秋 水 Qiū Shuǐ)
- Qi Xi (齐 溪) - Bai Lu (白 露 Bái Lù)
- Yang Di
- Zhang Boyu
- Zhao Yiwei
- Shen Tingting
- Wu Mochou - Wei Yan (魏 妍 Wèi Yán)
- Sha Yi (沙 溢) - Mr. Bai (白老師 Bái-lǎoshī)
- Lei Kesheng
- Vivien Li
- Lü Xing

== Theme song ==
- "Wan Wu Sheng Zhang" (万物生长; "Everything Grows") — same title as the film's Chinese name
  - Lyrics: Feng Tang - the author of the original novel
  - Music and singer: Song Dongye

== Box office ==
It opened in China on April 17, 2015, and earned US$11.59 million in its opening weekend, with 79,322 screenings and 2.13 million admissions, debuting at number two, behind Hollywood blockbuster film Furious 7.
