= Summer Palace (2006 film) =

- Promotional poster
- Traditional Chinese: 頤和園
- Simplified Chinese: 颐和园
- Hanyu Pinyin: Yíhé Yuán
- Directed by: Lou Ye
- Written by: Lou Ye; Mei Feng; Ma Yingli
- Produced by: Sylvain Bursztejn; Fang Li; Nai An
- Starring: Hao Lei; Guo Xiaodong
- Cinematography: Hua Qing
- Edited by: Lou Ye; Zeng Jian
- Music by: Peyman Yazdanian
- Production company: Fantasy Pictures
- Release date: April 18, 2006 (Cannes)
- Running time: 140 minutes
- Country: China
- Languages: Mandarin; German

Summer Palace (simplified Chinese: 颐和园; traditional Chinese: 頤和園; pinyin: Yíhé Yuán) is a 2006 Chinese romance film and the fourth feature film by director Lou Ye. The film was a Chinese-French collaboration produced by Dream Factory, Laurel Films, Fantasy Pictures and Sylvain Bursztejn's Rosem Films. It was made in association with France's Ministère de la Culture et de la Communication, Ministère des Affaires Étrangères and Centre National de la Cinématographie (CNC).

The film deals with a young student played by Hao Lei who leaves her small hometown to study at the fictional "Beiqing University" (an homage to Peking University). There she meets a fellow student and begins an intense romantic relationship in the backdrop of the 1989 Tiananmen Square protests and massacre. The film also follows the eventual disillusionment of these young idealists after the crackdown, as the years progress through the 1990s and into the 2000s (decade). The film is named after the Summer Palace located in Beijing.

The film is the first from mainland China to feature the full-frontal adult nudity of both its male and female leads, though earlier films such as Xiao Wu (1998), Lan Yu (2001), Green Hat (2003), and Star Appeal (2004), have featured full-frontal adult male nudity.

Summer Palace's sex scenes and political undertones made the film tinder for controversy in China, leading both the director, Lou Ye, and his producers into conflict with China's State Administration of Radio, Film, and Television (SARFT). After screening Summer Palace in the 2006 Cannes Film Festival without government approval, the film was placed under a de facto ban in Mainland China, and its filmmakers officially censored.

== Plot ==
Spanning several cities and over a decade, Summer Palace tells the story of Yu Hong (played by Hao Lei), a young woman from the border-city of Tumen, who is accepted to the fictional Beiqing University, a name that evokes both Peking University ("Beida") and Tsinghua University ("Qinghua"). While in school, Yu meets Li Ti, her best friend (played by Hu Lingling), and Zhou Wei, her college boyfriend and the love of her life (played by Guo Xiaodong). The film is divided into two parts. The first begins in the late 1980s (subtitles inform the audience of the place and year at various points in the film), as Yu Hong enters the university. Lonely and isolated despite the cramped living conditions, Yu Hong eventually befriends another student, Li Ti, who introduces her to her boyfriend Ruo Gu (played by Zhang Xianmin), and Ruo Gu's friend Zhou Wei. Yu Hong and Zhou Wei embark upon a passionate but volatile love affair just as political forces are moving towards Tiananmen Square.

Two events then bring the first half of the film to a close: First, Zhou Wei, incensed at the jealousy and emotional instability of his girlfriend, begins to have an affair with Li Ti; and second, the crackdown occurs on the students on Tiananmen Square and on the campus of Beida. During all of this, Yu Hong's old boyfriend Xiao Jun (played by Cui Jin) from Tumen arrives and the two of them leave, Yu Hong deciding that she will drop out from the university.

The film then fast forwards several years, as Lou Ye intersperses the travels of his three main characters with news footage of the end of the Cold War, and the 1997 Hong Kong handover. Yu Hong has left Tumen again, first for Shenzhen, and then for the central China city of Wuhan, while Li Ti and Ruo Gu have moved to Berlin. Yu Hong is unable to forget Zhou Wei, and has empty affairs with a married man and a kind but quiet mailroom worker. The film follows her disaffection with society and her use of sex as a substitute for contentment. Eventually discovering that she is pregnant, Yu Hong gets an abortion and moves to Chongqing where she marries.

Li Ti, Ruo Gu, and Zhou Wei, meanwhile, live a quiet life as expatriates in Berlin. While Li Ti and Zhou Wei still occasionally make love, the former quietly realizes that the latter does not love her. Though the three friends appear happy, when Zhou Wei decided to return to China, Li Ti suddenly commits suicide. In Chongqing Zhou connects with former classmates who give him Yu Hong's email address.

After more than ten years, Zhou and Yu at last reunite in the resort city of Beidaihe. While they embrace, they ask each other, "Now what?" When Yu leaves, ostensibly to buy drinks, Zhou understands that they can never be together and leaves as well.

== Cast ==
- Hao Lei as Yu Hong – the film's heroine, a young student at the fictional Beiqing University from the small town of Tumen, Jilin on the North Korean-Chinese border. Yu Hong is a willful young woman who desires to live life more intensely. Her love affair with the character of Zhou Wei serves as the basis of the film.
- Guo Xiaodong as Zhou Wei – Yu Hong's love interest, another student at the same university. Something of an intellectual, Zhou Wei is both deeply in love with Yu Hong and prone to infidelity. When the Tiananmen protests arrive, he like his fellow students join in the movement.
- Hu Ling as Li Ti – Yu Hong's best friend and eventual rival. Li Ti, an English-language major at the same university, is the first to befriend the sullen, quiet Yu Hong. Though considered a cynic, she harbors a romantic side as well.
- Zhang Xianmin as Ruo Gu – Li Ti's boyfriend, a student studying abroad in Berlin.
- Cui Lin as Xiao Jun – Yu Hong's high school boyfriend from Tumen.
- Bai Xueyun as Wang Bo – Yu Hong's lover in Wuhan.
- Chloe Maayan as Dong Dong

Lou Ye picked Hao Lei from over 400 candidates because she was the only one who turned him down, fearing the sex scenes would hurt her love relationship. As Lou said later, "That was something Yu Hong would say, so I had to have her play (Yu)." The entire crew waited patiently for Hao to accept, for so long that the original choice for Zhou Wei, Liu Ye, had to abandon the project. Hao was very touched and agreed, but her relationship with actor Deng Chao did end as a result. Lou's 2012 film Mystery reunited him with Hao.

== Soundtrack ==
Iranian composer Peyman Yazdanian did the film score.

The film also features a number of songs from all around the world, including a song by Hao Lei (which she recorded in 2003 for Rhinoceros in Love):

- "Yangqi" (氧气; "Oxygen") performed by Hao Lei
- "Qingchun Wuqu" (青春舞曲; "Dance of Youth") by Lo Ta-yu
- "Don't Break My Heart" by Dou Wei (Black Panther)
- "Can't Take My Eyes Off You" performed by Andy Williams
- "Seven Little Girls Sitting in the Backseat" performed by Paul Evans
- "Mickey" performed by Toni Basil
- "In Yeon" (인연; "Fate") by Ha Dong-jin
- "Sólo por tu amor" performed by Manuel Franjo
- "Suliko" performed by the Chikovani family

== Release ==
=== Theatrical ===
Summer Palace premiered at the Cannes Film Festival on May 18, 2006, and was released theatrically in France a year later on April 18, 2007, by Océan Films, under the title Une Jeunesse Chinoise (in English, "A Chinese Youth"). The film received its American debut in the Mill Valley Film Festival on October 10, 2006, and a limited theatrical release beginning on January 18, 2008, through distributor Palm Pictures.

=== Home media ===
Summer Palace was released on Region 2 DVD in France on January 28, 2008. The single disc edition includes the film in its original Mandarin with French subtitles, along with special features such as a making-of documentary, a featurette on censorship, Lou Ye's film notes, and cast and crew biographies.

A Region 1 DVD was released in the United States on March 11, 2008, by Palm Pictures.

== Reception ==
Summer Palace was screened at several international film festivals, most notably Cannes, where it was the only Asian film in competition. However, the Palme d'Or eventually went to the Irish film, The Wind That Shakes the Barley, directed by Ken Loach. Besides Cannes, Summer Palace was also screened at a handful of top-tier festivals including Toronto and Mill Valley.

Critics were generally positive in reviews, citing the film's ambition and scope with the most common complaint being the film's excessive length at 140 minutes. Derek Elley of Variety claimed the film was "half an hour too long." The Daily Telegraph, meanwhile, also mentioned the "thirty minutes too long" complaint but stated that the film was nevertheless "a raw and unsettling new work." The Guardian also found the film "over-long and meandering," but also "stylish [and] atmospheric."

The New York Times gave a particularly glowing review for the film with film critic A. O. Scott writing that "...[despite] its 2-hour-20-minute length, 'Summer Palace' moves with the swiftness and syncopation of a pop song. Like Jean-Luc Godard in the 1960s, Mr. Lou favors breathless tracking shots and snappy jump cuts, and like Mr. Godard’s, his camera is magnetized by female beauty."

The film was released unrated in the United States. Several American film critics have described Summer Palace as one of the most sexually-explicit films in years; indeed David Denby of The New Yorker noted that he never seen so much lovemaking in an "aboveground" film, however, he also noted that these scenes are not pornographic, that is, never separated from emotion. Hong Kong feminist scholar Evelyn Wan argued that the “excessive sex scenes,” while disturbing, effectively convey the “sense of unsettledness and bewilderment” of the main characters.

=== Ban ===
Though Summer Palace was in competition for the Palme d'Or at the 2006 Cannes Film Festival, Lou and his producers had not received approval from Chinese censors, thus instigating an official censure by the Chinese State Administration of Radio, Film, and Television (SARFT). Chinese authorities pointed out that the film was banned due to the aesthetic reason. They claimed that the film's technical quality is poor. For example, blurred images are often detected in dorm room scenes. Ultimately, both Lou and his producer, Nai An, were forbidden by the Chinese Government to make any new films for five years.

Besides the filmmakers, Summer Palace itself was de facto banned when SARFT refused to grant a certificate to distribute in the Mainland, ostensibly because the film was not up to the official standards for picture and sound quality.

== Sex in Summer Palace ==
=== Sex and politics ===
In Summer Palace, the director "masterfully converges sexual awakening and romantic confusion with political radicalization and frustrated aspirations". The sexual revolution among young university students serves as a parallel to the political revolution in 1989. Scholar Shen Qinan points out that student's sexual exploration in 1980s aligns with the rapid social developments in China during that period. The correlation between student movement in Tiananmen Square and their sex life well explored and implied in the film. Dir. Lou Ye sees the relationship between students and the government as a romantic couple. He points out that the student movement to the government is similar to a lovemaking experience. The violent suppression can simply be seen as a unsatisfying sex experience shared by both parties. Sex scenes are rarely erotic in the film. On the contrary, the repetitive sexual intercourses are shown as "a clumsy athletic exercise, a messy enervation of tumbling bodies". Sex is used as a metaphor to address political issues in the film. When the film depicts the climax of the student movement, the song titled "Oxygen" becomes the soundtrack of the sequence. The song is sung by Hao Lei, who plays the role of Yu Hong. The song is also titled as "Making Love". Therefore, the combination of the song and the sequence showcases the close connection between sex and politics.

=== Sex and liberation ===
Scholar Shen points out "the need for sexual release increased in proportion to leisure, boredom, and chaos" during the student movement in 1989. One participant recalled that some students left the Tiananmen Square in the evening and engaged in (group) sexual intercourse nearby, and they considered the on and off campus sexual activities as the "first sexual liberation movement in New China". In the film, examples can be found where Yu Hong teaches Dongdong regarding masturbation and their sexual experiences with students from other universities.

=== Sex and female self-identity ===
The sex between Xiaojun and Yu does not always lead to pleasure. Yu is portrayed as "confused and sad" on occasions. In the film, she later indicates that " sex is the most direct way for her to show men her goodness". Song Ping appears more conserved about sex and values the sexual morals in conventional Chinese culture. Song sees Yu's frequent and pre-marriage sexual activities "disgusting". This character is meant to represent the generation of the Cultural Revolution, and her confrontation with Yu reveals the altering campus climate during the late 1980s that university is not only limited to study but also becomes a romantic space for young people.

== See also ==
- Lost in Beijing, director Li Yu's 2007 film, also produced by Fang Li's Laurel Films, which like Summer Palace, was banned by Chinese authorities.
- Film censorship in China
- Censorship in the People's Republic of China
- List of Chinese films of 2006
- Nudity in film (East Asian cinema since 1929)
