= Kiarostami (surname) =

Kiarostami is a surname. Notable people with the surname include:

- Abbas Kiarostami (1940–2016), Iranian film director, screenwriter, poet, photographer, and film producer
- Bahman Kiarostami (born 1978), Iranian film director, cinematographer, film editor, and film producer, son of Abbas Kiarostami
