= Full Metal Village =

- Directed by: Cho Sung-Hyung
- Written by: Cho Sung-Hyung
- Produced by: Helge Albers; Roshanak Behesht Nedjad; Konstantin Kröning
- Starring: Uwe Trede; Lore Trede; Klaus H. Plähn; Irma Schaack; Eva Waldow
- Cinematography: Marcus Winterbauer
- Edited by: Cho Sung-Hyung
- Music by: Peyman Yazdanian
- Distributed by: Zorro Film (Germany) (Theat.)
- Release date: 2 November 2006 (Lübeck Nordic Film Days)
- Running time: 90 minutes
- Country: Germany
- Language: German

Full Metal Village is a 2006 documentary film about the lives of the residents of a small village in the German state of Schleswig-Holstein, Wacken, in a series of interviews and visual tableaux as it prepares for the annual Wacken Open Air Festival. Taglined "Ein Heimatfilm", the director Cho Sung-Hyung explores the relationship of the 1,800 resident townsfolk and the brief annual influx of 70,000 metal music enthusiasts who attend the open-air concert.

Notable scenes of the film are elderly villagers who confess to have 'heard' that the concert-goers worship Satan, and over-enthusiastic concert-goers headbanging to the traditional regional anthem played by a local fire department band to open the festival.

== Awards ==
The film received three awards: the 2007 Best Documentary at the Guild of German Art House Cinemas, the 2006 Best Documentary at the Hessian Film Award (prior to the film's theatrical release) and the 2007 Max Ophüls Award at the Max Ophüls Festival. It was also nominated for Best New Documentary Film at the 2007 Zurich Film Festival.
