= Songs from the Southern Seas =

- Pesn' Juzhnykh Morej
- Directed by: Marat Sarulu
- Written by: Marat Sarulu
- Produced by: Sain Gabdullin; Karsten Stoter; Benny Dreschsel; Yuri Obukhov; Guillaume de Seille
- Cinematography: Georgii Beridze
- Edited by: Karl Riedl
- Music by: Andrei Sigle
- Release date: 2008
- Running time: 82 minutes
- Countries: Kazakhstan; Russia; France; Germany
- Languages: Kazakh; Russian

Songs from the Southern Seas or Song from the Southern Seas (Russian: Песни южных морей, romanized: Pesni yuzhnykh morey) is a 2008 Kazakh, German, French and Russian film directed by Marat Sarulu and produced by Sain Gabdullin, Karsten Stoter, Benny Dreschsel, Yuri Obukhov, Guillaume de Seille with English subtitles. The film was made under the following banners— Kino Company, Rohfilm, Kinoproba, Arizona Films.

== Plot ==
The film revolves around the lives of two couples: Ivan and his wife Mariia who are Russians; and Asaan and his wife who are Kazakh. Both families are living in camaraderie in a village in Great Steppe in Kazakhstan till a twist occurs in their lives. Maria gets pregnant and gives birth to a baby boy with dark complexion. Seeing the new-born's skin color, Ivan becomes suspicious and feels Maria has an affair with Asaan, who has similar complexion. This causes a rift between the two families that lasts 15 years and then takes a fateful turn. The young son of Ivan left his school studies and starts wandering around on his horse, gets into trouble with horse riders of Kyrgyz for stealing their cattle. His brother-in-law, a Cossack, also thrashes him for his lack of knowledge of his genealogy. Ivan, feeling rootless, meets his grandfather, who tells him about his family's multinational background. During this time Asaan is also in search of his distinct personality and sitting on the steppe, broods about a “woman of the southern seas” who could give him peace of mind. After some time, Asaan's wife also becomes pregnant and gives birth to a child with ginger-color complexion, which is similar to Ivan's complexion. The film is set around the Lake Issyk-kul in Kyrgyzstan.

== Cast ==
- Irina Angejkina as Maria
- Vladimir Yavorsky as Ivan
- Zhaidarbek Kunguzhinov as Asan
- Aijan Aitenova as Aisha

== Production ==
The film is directed by Marat Sarulu, who is also the story writer. The producers are Sain Gabdullin, Karsten Stöter, Benny Dreschsel, Yuri Obukhov, and Guillaume De Seille. Cinematography is credited to Seille. The film is edited by Giorgi Beridze and sound recording is by Karl Riedl. The production crew consisting of Kazakh, Russian, German, French conveys a message of international cooperation in film production. The music is folk based. The film's running time is 80 minutes. The worldwide premiere of the film was on 14 October 2009.
