= Fantasia (2014 film) =

2014 film

- Film poster
- Chinese: 幻想曲
Transcriptions
Standard Mandarin
- Hanyu Pinyin: Huànxiǎng qǔ
- Directed by: Wang Chao
- Written by: Wang Chao
- Produced by: Lu Jianmin; Wang Chao
- Starring: Jian Renzi
- Production companies: Hainan Legend Film & Television Co., Ltd.; Wuhan Legend Film & Television Art Co., Ltd.; Beijing Chunqiu Times Culture Co., Ltd.
- Release date: 21 May 2014 (Cannes)
- Country: China
- Language: Chinese

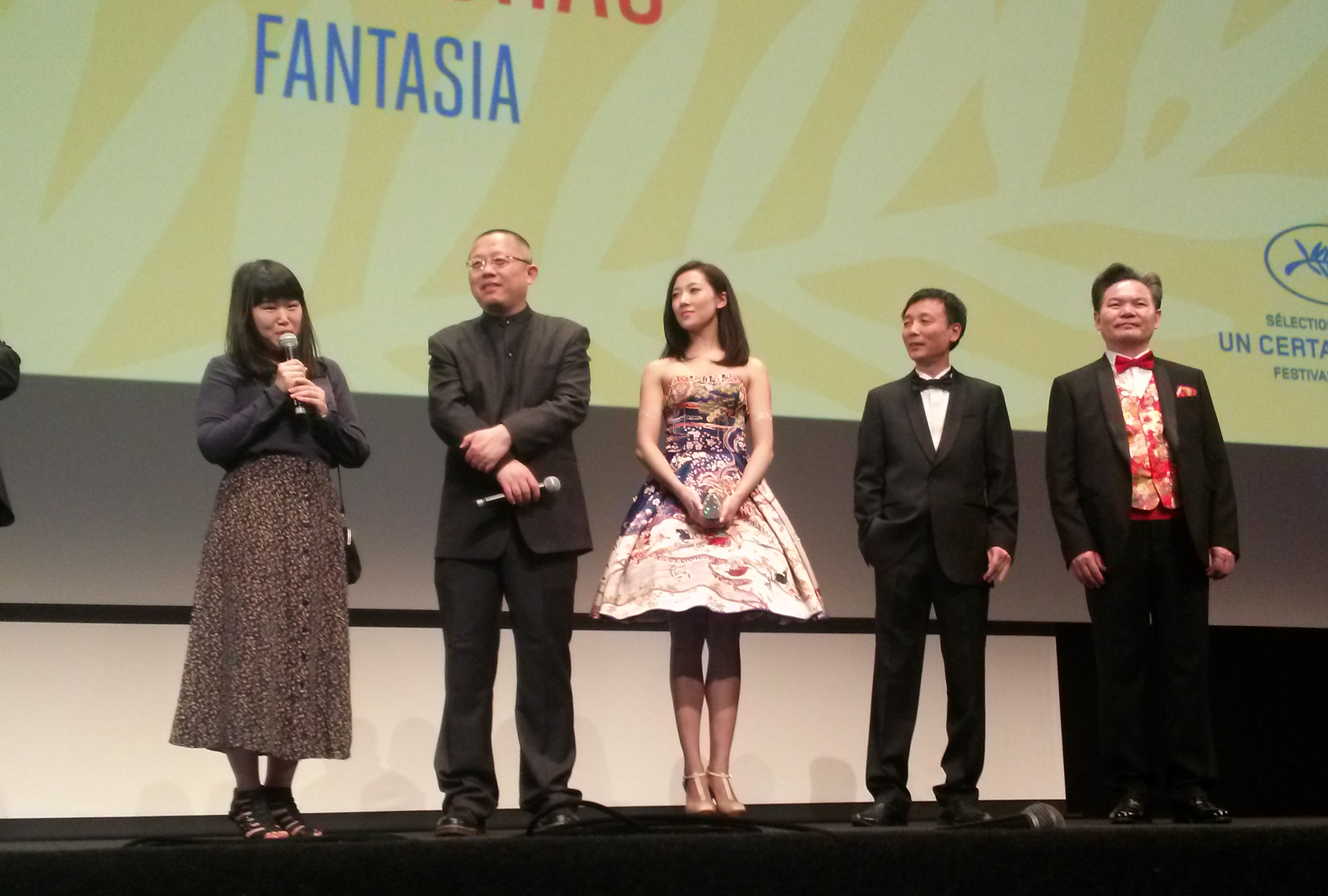
Presentation of Fantasia at the Cannes Film Festival.

Fantasia (Chinese: 幻想曲) is a 2014 Chinese drama film directed by Wang Chao. It was selected to compete in the Un Certain Regard section at the 2014 Cannes Film Festival.

== Cast ==
- Jian Renzi as Sister
- Hu Ruijie as Xiao Lin
- Su Su as Mother
- Zhang Xu as Father

== Reception ==
Derek Elley of Film Business Asia gave the film a score of 5 out of 10, describing it as an "average, uninventive indie".
