= Monir Shahroudy Farmanfarmaian =

Iranian artist (1922–2019)

- منیر شاهرودی فرمانفرمائیان
- Born: Monir Shahroudy; 13 January 1922; Qazvin, Sublime State of Iran
- Died: 20 April 2019 (aged 97); Tehran, Iran
- Resting place: Behesht-e Fatemeh Cemetery, Qazvin, Iran
- Education: University of Tehran, Parsons School of Design, Cornell University, Art Students League of New York
- Style: Traditional Persian mosaic work related to contemporary abstraction
- Movement: Geometric minimalism, Saqqakhaneh movement
- Spouses: Manoucher Yektai (m. 1950; div. 1953) Abol-Bashar Farmanfarmaian (m. 1957; died 1991)
- Children: 2
- Awards: Venice Biennale (1958)

Monir Shahroudy Farmanfarmaian (Persian: منیر شاهرودی فرمانفرمائیان; 13 January 1922 – 20 April 2019) was an Iranian artist and a collector of traditional folk art. She is noted for having been one of the most prominent Iranian artists of the contemporary period, and she was the first artist to achieve an artistic practice that weds the geometric patterns and cut-glass mosaic techniques (Āina-kāri) of her Iranian heritage with the rhythms of modern Western geometric abstraction.

In 2017, the Monir Museum in Tehran was opened in her honour.

== Early life and education ==
Shahroudy was born on 13 January 1922, to educated parents in the religious city of Qazvin, north-western Iran. Farmanfarmaian acquired artistic skills early on in childhood, receiving drawing lessons from a tutor and studying postcard depictions of Western art. She studied at the University of Tehran at the Faculty of Fine Art in 1944.

She then moved to New York City via steamboat, when World War II derailed her plans to study art in Paris. In New York, she studied at Cornell University, at Parsons School of Design, where she majored in fashion illustration, and at the Art Students League of New York.

== Career ==
As a fashion illustrator, she held various freelance jobs, working with magazines such as Glamour before being hired by the Bonwit Teller department store, where she made the acquaintance of a young Andy Warhol. Additionally, she learned more about art through her trips to museums and through her exposure to the 8th Street Club and New York's avant-garde art scene, becoming friends with artists and contemporaries Louise Nevelson, Jackson Pollock, Willem de Kooning, Barnett Newman, and Joan Mitchell.

=== First return to Iran ===
In early 1957, Farmanfarmaian moved back to Iran. Inspired by the resident culture, she discovered "a fascination with tribal and folk artistic tradition" of her country's history, which "led her to rethink the past and conceive a new path for her art." In the following years, she would develop her Persian inspiration by crafting mirror mosaics and abstract monotypes. Meanwhile, her work was featured at the Iran Pavilion in the 1958 Venice Biennale and held a number of exhibitions in places such as Tehran University (1963), the Iran-America Society (1973), and the Jacques Kaplan/Mario Ravagnan Gallery (1974).

=== Exile and return to Iran ===
In 1979, Farmanfarmaian and her second husband, Abol-Bashar, travelled to New York to visit family. Around the same time, the Islamic Revolution began, and so the Farmanfarmaians found themselves exiled from Iran, an exile that would last for over twenty years. Farmanfarmaian attempted to reconcile her mirror mosaics with the limited resources offered in America, but the lack of materials such as thin mirrors and the comparatively inexperienced workers restricted her work. In the meantime, she placed more significant emphasis on other aspects of her art, such as commissions, textile designs, and drawing.

=== Third return to Iran and death ===
In 1992, Farmanfarmaian returned to Iran and later, in Tehran in 2004, she reaffirmed her place among Iran's art community, gathering both former and new employees to help create her mosaics. She continued to live and work in Tehran until her death.

Farmanfarmaian died at her home at the age of 96 on 20 April 2019.

== Personal life ==
Farmanfarmaian married Iranian artist Manoucher Yektai in 1950. They divorced in 1953. In 1957, she returned to Tehran to marry lawyer Abolbashar Farmanfarmaian. In 1991, Abolbashar died of leukemia. She had two daughters, Nima Isham and Zahra Farmanfarmaian.

== Artwork ==
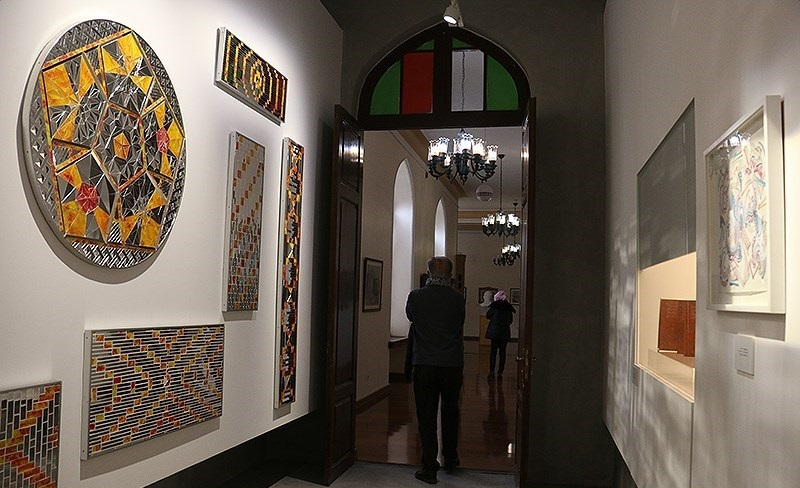
Monir Farmanfarmaian Hall at Negarestan Garden

While living in Iran, Farmanfarmaian was also an avid collector. She sought out paintings behind glass, traditional tribal jewellery and potteries, and amassed one of the greatest collections of "coffee-house paintings" in the country—commissioned paintings by folk artists as coffee-house, story-telling murals. The vast majority of her works and her collections of folk art were confiscated, sold or destroyed.

Aside from her mirror work (a technique known as Āina-kāri), Farmanfarmaian is additionally known for her paintings, drawings, textile designs, and monotypes.

=== Mirror mosaics ===
Around the 1970s, Farmanfarmaian visited the Shah Cheragh mosque in Shiraz, Iran. With the shrine's "high-domed hall ... covered in tiny square, triangular, and hexagonal mirrors," similar to many other ancient Iranian mosques, this event acted as a turning point in Farmanfarmaian's artistic journey, leading to her interest in mirror mosaic artwork. In her memoir, Farmanfarmaian described the experience as transformative:

"The very space seemed on fire, the lamps blazing in hundreds of thousands of reflection ... It was a universe unto itself, architecture transformed into performance, all movement and fluid light, all solids fractured and dissolved in brilliance in space, in prayer. I was overwhelmed."

Aided by the Iranian craftsman, Hajji Ostad Mohammad Navid, she created a number of mosaics and exhibition pieces by cutting mirrors and glass paintings into a multitude of shapes, which she would later reform into constructions which evoked aspects of Sufism and Islamic culture. Āina-kāri is the traditional art of cutting mirrors into small pieces and slivers, placing them in decorative shapes over plaster. This form of Iranian reverse glass and mirror mosaics is a craft traditionally passed on from father to son. Farmanfarmaian, however, was the first contemporary artist to reinvent the traditional medium in a contemporary way. By striving to mix Iranian influences and the tradition of mirror artwork with artistic practices outside of strictly Iranian culture, "offering a new way of looking at ancient aesthetic elements of this land using tools that are not limited to a particular geography," Farmanfarmaian was able to express a cyclical conception of spirituality, space, and balance in her mosaics.

== Exhibitions ==
Farmanfarmaian's work has been publicly exhibited in museums, including: Boston's Museum of Fine Arts, Victoria & Albert Museum, London (2006 & 2009), Niavaran Cultural Center, Tehran (2007), Leighton House Museum (2008), Beirut Exhibition Centre (2011), Museum of Modern Art (MoMA), Solomon R. Guggenheim Museum, Grand Rapids Art Museum, Haus der Kunst, Irish Museum of Modern Art (IMMA), Zentrum Paul Klee, Savannah College of Art and Design Museum and more. Her work has been shown in private galleries including, Rose Issa Projects, London; The Third Line, Dubai; New York; Grey Art Gallery, New York University; Galerie Denise Rene, Paris and New York; Lower Belvedere, Vienna; and Ota Fine Art, Tokyo.

Farmanfarmaian participated in the 29th Bienal de São Paulo (2010); the 6th Asia Pacific Triennial of Contemporary Art, Brisbane (2009); and the Venice Biennale (1958, 1966 and 2009). In 1958 she received the Venice Biennale, Iranian Pavilion (gold medal).

Suzanne Cotter curated Farmanfarmaian's work for her first large museum retrospective titled 'Infinite Possibility: Mirror Works and Drawings' which was on display at the Serralves Museum (also known as Fundação de Serralves) in Porto, Portugal (2014-2015), and then the exhibition travelled to the Solomon R. Guggenheim Museum in New York City (2015). This was her first large US museum exhibition.

Her work was included in the 2021 exhibition Women in Abstraction at the Centre Pompidou.

From November 18, 2022 – April 9, 2023, the High Museum of Art exhibited Monir Farmanfarmaian: A Mirror Garden. The exhibit was the first posthumous exhibit of her work and the title was borrowed from her 2007 memoir “which evokes the visual splendor of the artist’s mirror-mosaic sculptures.”

=== Commissioned installations ===
Major commissioned installations include work for the Queensland Art Gallery (2009), the Victoria and Albert Museum (2006), the Dag Hammerskjold building, New York (1981) and the Niyavaran Cultural Center (1977–78), as well as acquisitions by the Metropolitan Museum of Art, The Tehran Museum of Contemporary Art, and the Museum of Contemporary Art Tokyo.

== Collections ==
Farmanfarmaian's work is included in multiple public art collections worldwide, including: The Victoria & Albert Museum; The British Museum; the Metropolitan Museum of Art, Museum of Contemporary Art Chicago, Museum of Fine Arts, Houston, Tate Modern, Queensland Art Gallery, and others. In December 2017, the Monir Museum opened in Negarestan Park Gardens in Tehran and is dedicated to showcasing Farmanfarmaian's works. With a collection of 51 works donated by the artist, the Monir Museum collection is managed by the University of Tehran.

== In popular culture ==
Farmanfarmaian was named as one of the BBC's "100 Women" of 2015.

=== Film ===
Monir (2014) directed by Bahman Kiarostami, is a documentary film about Farmanfarmaian's life and work.

=== Publications ===
A Mirror Garden: A Memoir (2008) by Monir Farmanfarmaian and Zara Houshmand (ISBN 978-0307278784)

"In Persia in 1924, when a child still had to worry about hostile camels in the bazaar and a nanny might spin stories at her pillow until her eyes fell shut, the extraordinary and irresistible Monir Shahroudy Farmanfarmaian was born. From the enchanted basement storeroom where she played as a girl to the penthouse high above New York City where she would someday live, this is the delightful and inspiring story of her life as an artist, a wife and mother, a collector, and an Iranian. Here we see a mischievous girl become a spirited woman who defies tradition." (Excerpt from Penguin House)

Monir Sharoudy Farmanfarmaian: Heartaches (2007) by Rose Issa (ISBN 978-9646994539)

"The Heartaches' series sculptural boxes made of mixed collages and arrangements of photographs, prints and various objects was made by Monir Shahroudy Farmanfamaian in New York in the Nineties. These twenty-five intimate small-scale sculptures were primarily made after the loss of her husband, and draw inspiration from all the places, faces and paraphernalia that at some stage in her history were associated with a happy family life." (Excerpt from Amazon)

Selected Works of Monir Shahroudy Farmanfarmaian 1979-2008 (2009) (ISBN 978-6005191035)

"This overview of Iranian artist Farmanfarmaian charts a selection of her works created since she fled Iran at the beginning of the Iranian revolution in 1979, and that have been produced both during her exile in New York and subsequently since her return to her homeland some two decades later. While this period of exile has had an undeniable impact on the style of her work, aesthetic elements derived from Iranian traditions and practice remain consistently visible throughout her works. Presented in chronological order, this book includes a selection of the artists manuscripts, collages, reverse paintings on glass, mirror works, etchings and sculptures, all clearly and generously reproduced one to a page." (Excerpt from Amazon)

Monir Shahroudy Farmanfarmaian: Cosmic Geometry (2011) (ISBN 978-8862081757)

Published by Damiani Editore & The Third Line. The book features in-depth interview by Hans Ulrich Obrist, and critical essays by Nader Ardalan, Media Farzin and Eleanor Sims, tributes by Farmanfarmaian's friends Etel Adnan, Siah Armajani, caraballo-farman, Golnaz Fathi, Hadi Hazavei, Susan Hefuna, Aziz Isham, Rose Issa, Faryar Javaherian, Abbas Kiarostami, Shirin Neshat, Donna Stein and Frank Stella.

Other Publications:

Her work is documented in Iranian Contemporary Art, Barbican Art Centre, Booth Clibborn, 2001; Zendegi, 11 Iranian Contemporary Artists, Beirut Exhibition. She is referenced in an excerpt from The Sense of Unity: The Sufi Tradition in Persian Architecture by Nader Ardalan and Laleh Bakhtiar (1973), and an annotated timeline of Farmanfarmaian's life by Negar Azimi. Women in Abstraction, Centre Pompidou, (2021). She has a chapter in 'Women's Work' by Ferren Gipson.

== See also ==
- List of Iranian women in fine arts
