= Manoucher Yektai =

Iranian-American artist (1921–2019)

- منوچهر یکتایی
- Born: December 22, 1921; Tehran, Iran
- Died: November 19, 2019 (aged 97); New York City, U.S.
- Citizenship: US
- Education: École des Beaux-Arts; Art Students League of New York
- Known for: Painter, draughtsman
- Spouses: Monir Shahroudy Farmanfarmaian (m. 1950; div. 1953) Helene Kulukundis Yektai (m. 1968)
- Children: 4

Manoucher Yektai (Persian: منوچهر یکتایی) (December 22, 1921 – November 19, 2019) was an American artist. A member of the New York School of artists, Yektai's paintings synthesized diverse influences from the United States, France, and Iran into works that trouble distinctions between abstraction and representation.

== Early life and education ==
Born in Tehran, Iran, Yektai dropped out of Tehran University without obtaining a degree. Between 1945 and 1947, he studied with Amédée Ozenfant in Paris, and later in New York City. From 1946 to 1947, he studied at the École des Beaux-Arts, and at the atelier of André Lhote. From 1947 to 1948, he studied at the Art Students League of New York.

== Career ==
Yektai has many works in North American and European collections and museums, including the Museum of Modern Art, the Hirshhorn Museum and Sculpture Garden, San Francisco Museum of Modern Art, and numerous private collections such as the Yellowstone Art Museum.

== Personal life ==
Yektai was married to Iranian artist Monir Shahroudy Farmanfarmaian from 1950 to 1953. He became a naturalized U.S. citizen in 1959. In 1968, he married Helene Kulukundis Yektai, an author and illustrator of children's books. They remained married until his death in 2019 and had four children.

He died at the age of 97 in New York City on November 19, 2019.

== Selected solo exhibitions ==
- 1949: Woodstock, New York
- 1951, 1952, 1953: Grace Borgenicht Gallery, Inc., New York City
- 1956: American Associated Artists, New York City
- 1957, 1958, 1961, 1962, 1964: Poindexter Gallery, New York City
- 1959: Felix Landau Gallery Los Angeles County, California
- 1960,1961, 1963, 1965: Semia Huber Gallery, Zürich, Switzerland
- 1962: Anderson Meyer Gallery, Paris; Feingarten Gallery, Chicago, Illinois
- 1961, 1962, 1964, 1970: Picadilly Gallery, London, United Kingdom
- 1965, 1966, (67: Gertrude Kasle Gallery, Detroit, Michigan
- 1966. 1967, 1972, 1973, 1975, 1984, 1996: Elaine Benson Gallery, Bridgehampton, New York
- 1977, 1978: Galerie Zand, Teheran, Iran
- 1981, 1984: Alex Rosenberg Gallery, New York City
- 1988: Paris - New York: Kent Fine Art, Kent, Connecticut

== See also ==
- Islamic art
- Iranian art
- Islamic calligraphy
- List of Iranian artists
