= The Police Officer's Wife =

2013 film

- Film poster
- Directed by: Philip Gröning
- Written by: Philip Gröning; Carola Diekmann
- Produced by: Philip Gröning; Matthias Esche; Philipp Kreuzer; Werner Wirsing
- Starring: Alexandra Finder; David Zimmerschied
- Cinematography: Philip Gröning
- Edited by: Philip Gröning; Hannes Bruun; Karl Riedl (co-editor)
- Release dates: 30 August 2013 (Venice); 20 March 2014 (Germany)
- Running time: 175 minutes
- Country: Germany
- Language: German

The Police Officer's Wife (German: Die Frau des Polizisten) is a 2013 German drama film directed by Philip Gröning. It was screened in the main competition section at the 70th Venice International Film Festival where it won the Special Jury Prize.

== Cast ==
- Alexandra Finder as Christine Perkinger
- David Zimmerschied as Uwe Perkinger
- Pia Kleemann as Clara Perkinger
- Chiara Kleemann as Clara Perkinger
- Horst Rehberg
- Katharina Susewind
- Lars Rudolph
