= My Brother's Name Is Robert and He Is an Idiot =

2018 film

- Film poster
- Directed by: Philip Gröning
- Written by: Philip Gröning
- Starring: Josef Mattes
- Release date: 21 February 2018 (Berlin)
- Running time: 174 minutes
- Country: Germany
- Language: German

My Brother's Name Is Robert and He Is an Idiot (German: Mein Bruder heißt Robert und ist ein Idiot) is a 2018 German drama film directed by Philip Gröning. It was selected to compete for the Golden Bear in the main competition section at the 68th Berlin International Film Festival.

== Cast ==
- Josef Mattes as Robert
- Julia Zange as Elena
- Urs Jucker as Erich
- Stefan Konarske as Adolf
- Zita Aretz as Cecilia
- Karolina Porcari as teacher
