= Factory Boss =

- Film poster
- Directed by: Zhang Wei
- Cinematography: Lutz Reitemeier (BVK)
- Edited by: Karl Riedl, Wu Yixiang
- Production companies: ShenZhen HuaHao Film & Media Co., Ltd
- Release date: October 21, 2014
- Running time: 98 minutes
- Country: China
- Language: Mandarin

Factory Boss (Chinese: 打工老板) is a 2014 Chinese film directed by Zhang Wei. It was released in China on October 21, 2014.

== Cast ==
- Yao Anlian
- Tang Yan
- Zhao Ju
- Huang Jingyi

== Film Festival ==
- 38th Montreal World Film Festival

Awarded Best Actor

- 33rd Fajr International Film Festival

Awarded Best Original Screenplay May 2, 2015

- 8th Bangaluru Intl Film Festival-2016

February 4, 2016 Bangaluru, India Screening

- Asia House Film Festival

February 26, 2016 London, United Kingdom Screening

- Beijing International Film Festival

April 22, 2016 Beijing, China Screening

- San Jose Cinequest Film Festival

San Jose, USA Screening

- Asian American International Film Festival

July 23 - Aug 1st, 2015 New York, USA Audience Award (Narrative Feature)

- Cleveland International Film Festival

March 19–21, 2015 Cleveland, USA Screening
