= Jian Renzi =

Chinese actress

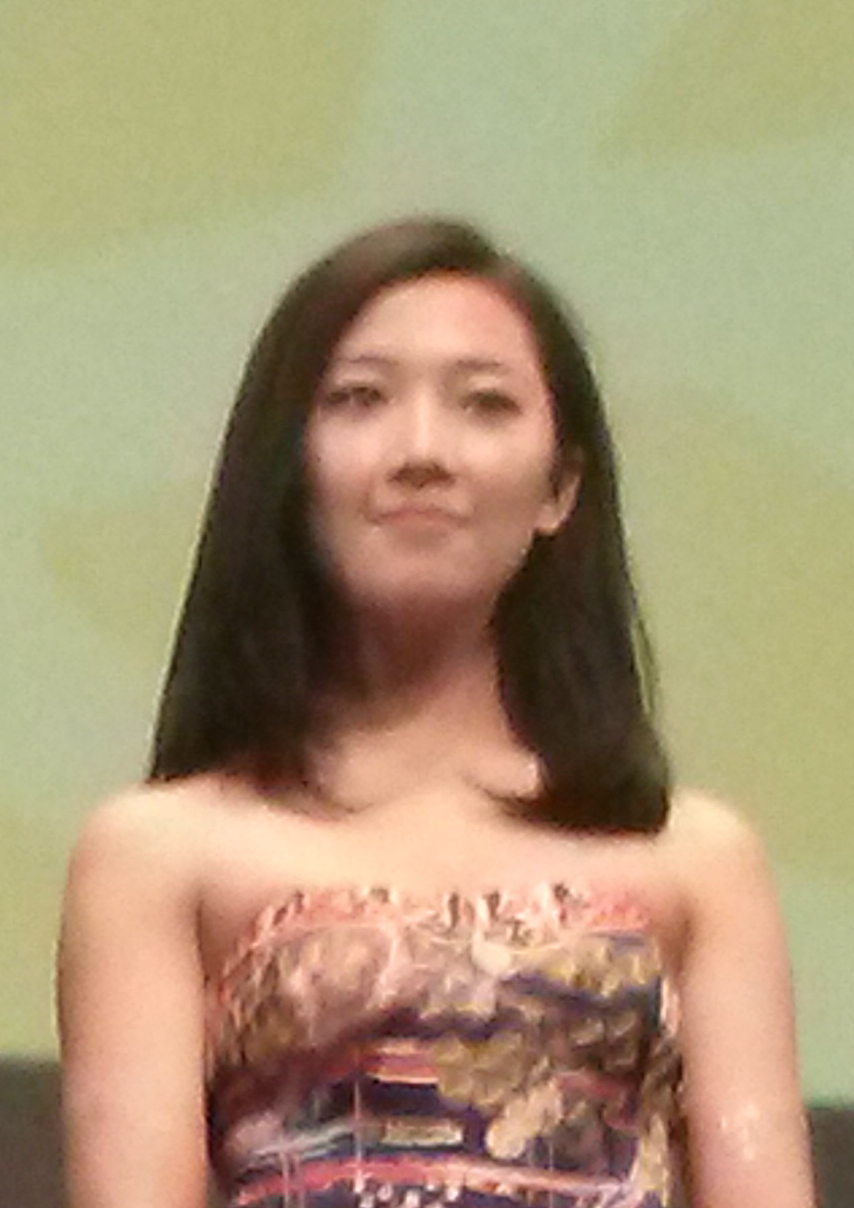
- Born: October 9, 1991 (age 34); Shenyang, Liaoning, China
- Other name: Joyce
- Education: Central Academy of Drama
- Years active: 2012–present

Jian Renzi (Chinese: 菅纫姿; born 19 October 1991), also known as Joyce Jian, is a Chinese actress. She is known for her roles in My Sunshine (2015) and Game of Hunting (2017).

== Early life and education ==
Jian was born 19 October 1991 in Shenyang, Liaoning, China. She graduated from the Central Academy of Drama in 2014.

== Career ==
Jian started her acting career in 2014 with the movie Fantasia. In the same year she started to gain popularity for her role in The Romance of the Condor Heroes. In 2015 she rose to fame starring as He Yimei in the television show My Sunshine. The show was a huge success in China gaining over 10 billion views online and won Audience's Favorite TV Series (Dragon TV) at the 1st China Television Drama Quality Ceremony.

In 2017, she starred alongside Hu Ge in the TV show Game of Hunting. Jian gained popularity due to the show and received positive reviews for her performance. She was cast in the wuxia drama Wen Tian Lu, and spy drama Autumn Cicada.

In 2018, Jian starred in the workplace drama Partners.

== Filmography ==
=== Film ===
Year	English Title	Chinese Title	Role	Notes
2014	Fantasia	幻想曲	Older Sister	
2014	Jiang Yiwu	辛亥元勋蒋翊武	Liu Wen	
2016	Lost Minds	失心者	Ai Qing	
2018	Looking for Rohmer	寻找罗麦	Julie	
TBA		爱我就说是	Coco	

=== Television series ===
Year	English title	Chinese title	Role	Notes
2014	The Sword Team	刀之队	Xiao Yun	
2014	OB GYNS	爱的妇产科	Deng Xiaoyu	
2014	The Romance of the Condor Heroes	神雕侠侣	Rou Er	
2015	My Sunshine	何以笙箫默	He Yimei	
2015	The Double Life of Veronique	两生花	Xin Xin	
2015	Get Married	上错花轿之三嫁奇缘	Zhang Xizhen	
2016	The Love of Happiness	因为爱情有幸福	Su Mei	
2016		待嫁十年	Dong Xiaofang	
2017	Game of Hunting	猎场	Luo Yiren	
2017	Partners	合伙人	Xin Qing	
2019	Xi Wang De Tian Ye	希望的田野		
2020	Autumn Cicada	秋蝉	Shizumi Junko	
2020	Wen Tian Lu	问天录之少年钟馗	Nian Er/Bing Die/Bai Ning Yu	
TBA	New City	新海		
2021	Legend of Wu Zi Xu	白马曾骑踏海潮	Zhongli Wufeng	
