= Luxury Car (film) =

- French one-sheet
- Directed by: Wang Chao
- Written by: Wang Chao
- Produced by: Sylvain Bursztejn; Mao Yonghong; Zhou Weisi
- Starring: Tian Yuan; Wu Youcai; Li Yiqing; Huang He
- Cinematography: Liu Yonghong
- Edited by: Tao Wen
- Music by: Xiao He
- Distributed by: Celluloid Dreams (France)
- Release date: 22 May 2006 (Cannes)
- Running time: 88 minutes
- Countries: China; France
- Language: Mandarin

Luxury Car (Chinese: 江城夏日; pinyin: Jiāng chéng xià rì; lit. 'River City Summer Days') is a 2006 film directed by Wang Chao. The film was produced by China's Bai Bu Ting Media and France's Rosem Films, and in association with Arte France Cinéma.

Luxury Car premiered on 22 May 2006 at the 2006 Cannes Film Festival, where it won the competition for the Prix un certain regard.

== Plot ==
The film follows an old man from the countryside who goes to Wuhan to search for his missing son, who his dying wife has requested to see one last time. In Wuhan, he meets his daughter, a karaoke bar escort who introduces him to an old police officer who offers to help. It soon becomes apparent to both the father and the policeman that the mobsters running the daughter's karaoke bar and the son's disappearance are linked.

== Cast ==
- Tian Yuan, as Li Yanhong, a young woman from the countryside who has moved to the city in search of a better life. She finds herself, however, working as a prostitute in a karaoke bar instead.
- Wu Youcai, as Li Qiming, Li Yanhong's father, an elderly schoolteacher who has come to Wuhan in search of his son.
- Li Yiqing, as a policeman, an aging detective who has agreed to help Li Yanhong in his search
- Huang He, as He Ge the owner of the Karaoke bar and Li Yanhong's "boyfriend"
- Li Li, as A Li, another prostitute and Li Yanhong's roommate.

== Production history ==
=== Story ===
Luxury Car is the third film in Wang's informal trilogy on life in modern China following The Orphan of Anyang (2001) and Day and Night (2004). The concept for the film and its focus on parents who have become disconnected from their children, came about, according to Wang, after he discovered that his mother had contracted cancer. Wang has also stated what his socially conscious intentions were behind the film:

The gap between the rich and poor, the distance which separates people from happiness, the contradictions between the social system inherited from the past and the burdens of the present: these are problems that I myself, as a full-fledged member of the people, feel all the weight and intensity of. That's what made me decide to shoot the picture.

=== Location ===
The film was shot and takes place almost entirely within the city of Wuhan in central China's Hubei province. Director Wang Chau noted that Wuhan represents to him, a "very typical Chinese city," in particular its mix of urban and rural, modern and traditional.

The main cast in addition, were all locals from the city, including the actors playing the father, the police officer and the daughter.

== Reception ==
Outside of the film festival circuit, Luxury Car remains little seen. For those audiences that have seen the film, the reaction has been muted praise. The Hollywood Reporter's Dwayne Byrge, for example, after seeing the film at Cannes praised Luxury Car's cast, in particular Wu Youcai as the father and Chinese pop star Tian Yuan in the role of the daughter, but overall found the film "predictable and narratively uninspired."

On the other hand, Variety's Derek Elley showered only praise on the film, emphasizing the performances of Tian and Wu, and noting that the film is "tightly written and beautifully played."
