= Feng Tang =

Chinese writer (born 1971)

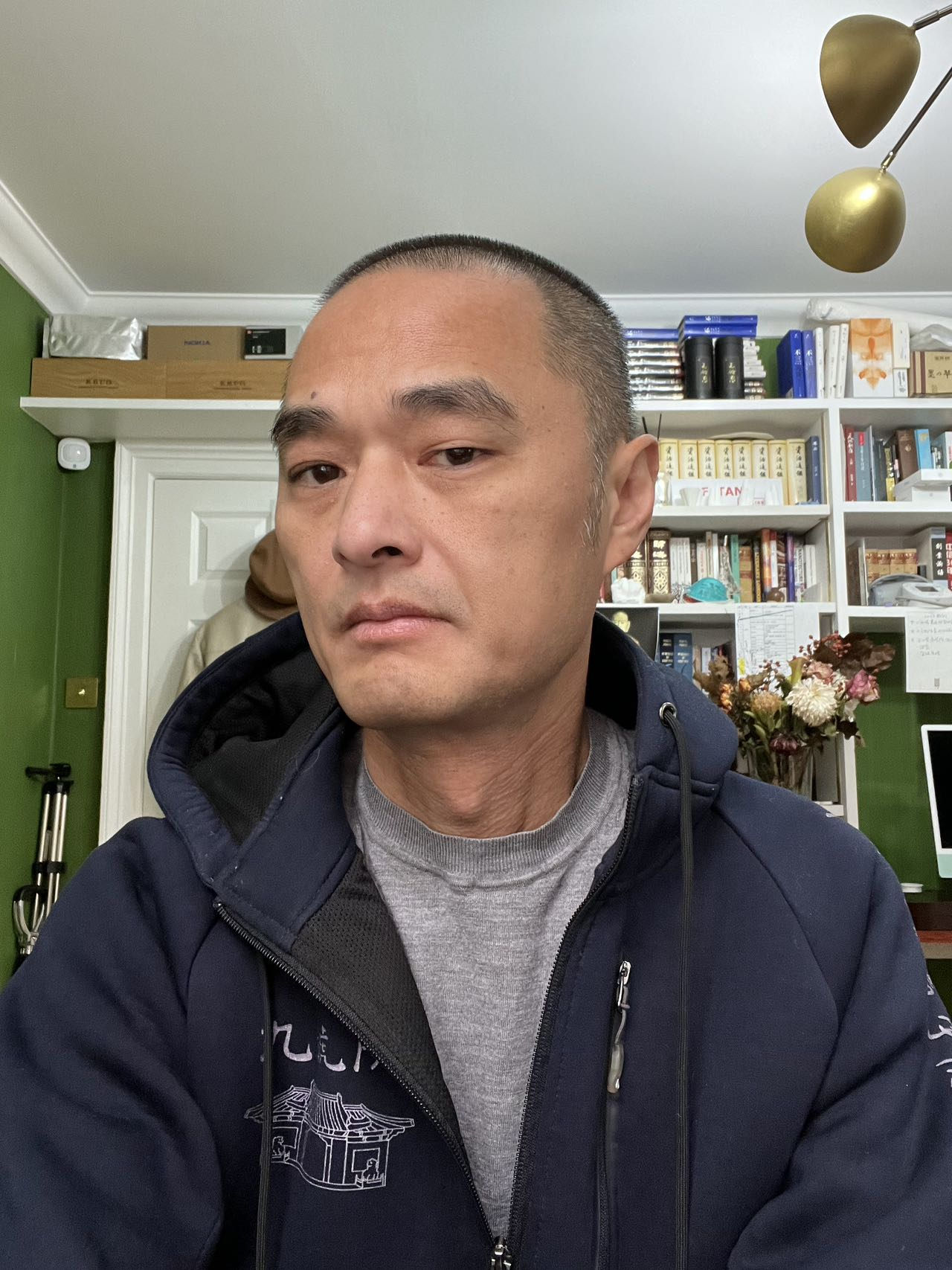
- Born: May 13, 1971; Beijing, China
- Education: Peking Union Medical College; Emory University
- Occupations: Novelist; poet; private equity investor
- Writing career
- Notable works: Beijing, Beijing; Give me a Girl at Eighteen; Everything Grows; Oneness; No Woman, No Cry; One Hundred Poems of Feng Tang; All Three Lines; Aging; Getting Things Done; Read to Great

Feng Tang (born May 13, 1971, whose real name is Zhang Haipeng) is a contemporary Chinese novelist, poet, artist, management consultant and private equity investor.

== Early Life and Career ==
Feng Tang was born on May 13, 1971, in Beijing. He spent his childhood and teenage years in Chuiyangliu, a place frequently referenced in his works. The young Feng Tang studied in Beijing No.80 High School from 1984 until 1990. After high school, he enrolled at Peking Union Medical College, where he earned a Doctoral of Medicine (M.D.) degree in clinical medicine with a specialization in gynecological oncology in 1998. Two years later, he graduated from Emory University's Goizueta Business school with an MBA, earning a scholarship, and subsequently joined McKinsey & Company.

In 2001, when Feng Tang was 30 years old and freshly graduated from his MBA program, his first book "Everything Grows 萬物生長" was published in China. Over the next few years, he continued working and publishing various novels, short stories, poems, and essays, included his first trilogy "The Beijing Trilogy 北京三部曲", which became one of his most famous works. In 2005, he received the third People's Literature Award, established by People's Literature Magazine, the most iconic literature magazine in China.

In 2011, his novel "Oneness 不二" was published in Hong Kong and garnered wider recognition for his literary talents. The book broke sales record in Hong Kong at the time, and the media humorously proclaimed that "from now on, Hong Kong's publishing industry relies on Feng Tang". In 2012, Feng Tang was listed at the top of the "Top 20 under 40 future literature masters in China", a one-time list issued by People's Literature magazine.

While working full-time as a business professional, Feng Tang continued to write in his spare time. In 2014, his novel "No Woman, No Cry 女神一號/素女經(HK version)" was published in Hong Kong and mainland China.

In July 2014, feeling the need to slow down and find quietness, he resigned from China Resources Healthcare Group Limited and took a short residence in California. During this time, he was approached by Zhejiang Literature and Arts Publishing House to re-translate Tagore's Stray Birds in Chinese. He rented a house near the Napa Valley, shabby, but with a large yard, and spent three months on translating Stray Birds. The book received significant controversy and criticism when published in 2015 and finally has been taken down from the shelves a few months later. Nonetheless, Feng Tang believed his translation better reflects contemporary Chinese language, and he trusted that history and literature would make their judgments.

In early 2015, Feng Tang returned to Hong Kong and joined CITIC Capital Partners Management Limited as a senior management director. Despite his professional commitments, he keeps on writing as a serious hobby. In 2017, Guomai Publishing House and Motie Publishing House held autograph seminars for Feng Tang throughout China, attracting crowds of fans. He also began attending online programs and collaborating with others on calligraphy exhibitions.

In 2019, Feng Tang was named by the GQ magazine as one of the most influential authors in the past ten years, and he was rated as the author with the best-selling record of all time by Dangdang, the most famous online book selling website in China. In 2020, Feng Tang has been nominated and selected as the recipient of Emory University's Sheth Distinguished International Alumni Award.

In January 2021, Feng Tang left Citic Capital and subsequently established the "Chengshi Bu'er'' (成事不二堂) Management Consulting Company, producing business management courses and literature. Since then, he has concentrated on writing, publishing, lectures, and artistic activities.

== Written Works ==
=== Novels ===
Feng Tang is best known for his novels "Beijing Trilogy" and "Oneness". In his works, Feng Tang persistently explores the dynamics of libido and the anima image, using them as guiding tools in his examination of the human experience. These themes, although explored by earlier Chinese writers, have been to a certain degree unheeded in the modern era. These recurrent themes shape his unique writing style, which ranges from exaggerated, rebellious, and even at times obscene, elegant and poetic. Despite the contrast, he maintains a tasteful balance and commands a singular artistic vision throughout his books. His distinctive style is so recognizable and often imitated that it has been dubbed by the public as the "Feng Tang Style" (馮唐體).

His "Beijing Trilogy" is a series of autobiographical novels dealing with his childhood, teenage years, early adulthood and beyond. The first book of the trilogy (chronologically the second book in the series but published first) "Everything Grows" was published in 2001. The book was later adapted into a film in 2015, starring some of China's top actors such as Fan Bingbing and Han Geng. In 2007, the book was translated and published in French. The next book, "Give Me a Girl at Age Eighteen 十八歲給我一個姑娘" was published in 2005 and was later adapted into a 21-episode drama by Youku, China's largest video steaming provider. It was translated and published in French and Italian in 2009 and 2020 respectively. The last book of the trilogy " Beijing, Beijing 北京, 北京" was published in 2007, and translated in English in 2015. In 2017 the book was adapted into a 40-episode drama series Shall I Compare You to a Spring Day and aired in July. The drama won the "29th China TV Golden Eagle Award" in Outstanding Television Series category in 2018.

"Oneness" (the Buddhist concept of "non-dualism") was published in 2011 and subverted the stories of historical figures from the Tang dynasty in a tale of sexually adventurous monks, nuns, and poets. It is Feng Tang's most famous work and be the best-selling novel in HK publishing history.

The other novels included "Happiness 歡喜", and "No Woman, No Cry", which was published in 2007 and 2014 respectively. "Happiness" was written when Feng Tang was seventeen. It is a school life story set in Beijing in the late eighties and talking about various adolescent behaviours in the high school. "No Woman, No Cry" describes the complicated life of a biotech start up company CEO, and his efforts to write a unique book entitled On Everything.

=== Poems ===
Feng Tang considers himself primarily a poet, even though he is often hailed as one of the finest novelists of his generation. He has written nearly 800 poems, most of which are relatively short. Feng Tang created a new style of poetry, advocating for expression through very concise and refined wordings.

His first poetry collection, "One Hundred Poems of Feng Tang 馮唐詩百首", was published in 2011 and collected 116 poems, included the highly acclaimed poem "Spring (春)". His best-known poems likely deal with themes of nature and love. In 2018, he published "All Three Lines 不三" in Hong Kong, a collection of 305 poems, each comprised just three lines. Six years later, "All Three Lines" was re-published in mainland China named as "Let's Meet 見一面吧".

In 2015, Feng Tang collaborated with his DJ friend YangCheng to produce a book and CD titled "Reciting Poems 吟詩", which included almost fifty passages from his novels, poems, and essays, along with four new poems.

In August 2014, Feng Tang was invited to translate the Tagore's "Stray Birds" in Chinese. The book, published in 2015, was widely criticized, with critics claiming that Feng Tang had overstepped as a translator by sexing up Tagore's soft-toned poems and strayed too far from the original text. Feng Tang defended his translation, insisting that the spirit of translation lies in breaking the rigidity of habit and continuously innovating. He believes the most important role for artists is to destroy the old world and create a new one. Four years later, "Stray Birds 飛鳥集" was re-published by Cosmos Books in Hong Kong.

In 2024, Feng Tang's mother passed away. A year later, he created a poetry collection titled "I, the Unfading Flower 作為花我從來沒敗過" as a tribute to her. The poetry collection includes 102 newly written poems and essays, alongside 101 photographs of his mother's personal belongings. Through this, Feng Tang reconstructs the vivid trajectory of his mother's life and pays tribute to her resilient vitality.

=== Short stories ===
Feng Tang's best-known collections of short stories include "Of All The Balls 天下卵" and "So Insane 搜神記". "Of All The Balls" published in 2012 and retitled "安陽" when re-published in 2017. The book includes eight short stories, drawing from history, fairy tales, and reality. In 2020, the book was translated by Lavinia Benedetti and published in Italian. "Of All The Balls", "So Insane" and "Oneness" have been formed as a new trilogy named "supernatural trilogy".

"So Insane" assembles eight short stories: " In Your Twenties", "On Masturbation is One Type of Sport", "Perfect Enlightenment", "The Duck Man", "Fifty One Spotlights", "The Clitoris Yoga Master", "The Twilight Chef", and "All Kinds of Plants in This World are Beautiful". In November 2015, Feng Tang hosted a TV show "Sou Shen Ji" and interviewed 13 distinctive figures in China from different industries. In 2017, "So Insane" was published based on the show. The book resembles a collection of supernatural stories, but the characters are real people, troubled by their own emotions or facing various dilemmas in life. Their "insanity" or superpowers, as described in the book, stem from their bodies and sensual instincts. Feng Tang believes the sensual instinct of a human being has unlimited potentials, which will never be replaced by artificial intelligence.

=== Essays ===
In 2005, Feng Tang published his first collection of essays, "Pig and Butterfly 豬和蝴蝶", which earned him an award from People's Literature Magazine. Over the following decades, he continued to publish other collections, including "Aging 活著活著就老了", "How to Become a Monster 如何成為一個怪物", "36 Biggies in Life 三十六大", "Hanging on there in the Universe 在宇宙間不易被風吹散", "Fearlessness / How to fight middle age 無所畏 / 如何避免成為一個油膩的中年猥瑣男 (HK Version) ", "Shall I Compare You to a Spring Day 春風十里不如你", "Being Capable 有本事", "Winning with Confidence 穩赢" and ''Jin Nang: The Silk Bag of Wisdom 錦囊''.

=== Management works ===
Since 2019, Feng Tang has increasingly focused on management writing. Major works include: "Getting Things Done 成事", "the Secret of Getting Things Done 馮唐成事心法", " Read to Great 了不起", "Golden Line 金線", "Win before You Fight 勝者心法：資治通鑑成事之道", "Strong Breakthrough 強者破局：資治通鑒成事之道", "The Right Way 正道", "The Strategist of Positioning 能人謀勢：資治通鑒成事之道" and "Walkthrough 通關: 馮唐講透孫子兵法取勝之道".

In these books, Feng Tang intertwines western McKinsey management methods with the classic Chinese wisdom of success, integrating his 20 years of personal practice in the workplace. He elaborates on his unique viewpoints and methodologies for success and guides readers on how to get things done.

== Calligraphy ==
In China's literary tradition, authorship and penmanship go hand in hand, and Feng Tang has remained loyal to this tradition. In July 2017, his calligraphy work "Looking into Flowers 觀花止" debuted at the art exhibition "Dreaming into Flowers 夢筆生花---當代語境中的人文藝術" in Beijing, accompanied by works from many famous Chinese artists and writers, including Nobel Laureate Mo Yan.

In April 2018, Feng Tang met the renowned Japanese photographer Nobuyoshi Araki, and the two artists collaborated on a calligraphy exhibition titled "Calligraphy as Oneness 書道不二".

From December 2019 to January 2020, Feng Tang's solo exhibition "Feng Tang Happy Land 馮唐樂園" was held in Beijing and Shanghai. The exhibition comprised six scenes and was interpreted through calligraphy, photograph and lamplight to create a unique experience for audiences.

In March 2020, the luxury brand and pen manufacturer Montblanc invited Feng Tang to create the MontBlanc Feng Tang Font, which will be used in all of MontBlanc's Chinese publishing marketing materials.

In response to the COVID-19 pandemic in December 2020, when people changed their habits and spent more time at home, Feng Tang's private exhibition "Otaku 宅" was held in Beijing from December 2020 to February 2021. A total of 53 calligraphy works and paintings were displayed.

In August and October 2021, another private exhibition by Feng Tang, "Form and Emptiness 色空" was held in Beijing and Hangzhou. The exhibition showcased 60 of his calligraphy works and paintings, and the use of VR technology provided visitors with a sensuous experience.

In 2022, Feng Tang held his 3rd round of calligraphy exhibition, "Tea the Wild", in Shanghai and Beijing. It displayed over 50 of his calligraphy works and paintings.

In 2023, sponsored by Montblanc, Feng Tang held his 4th round of calligraphy exhibition, "Everything Grows 萬物生長", as a traveling exhibition in Guangzhou Beijing and Chengdu from Spring to Autumn. Over 60 calligraphy and painting works, as well as 30 pottery pieces, were exhibited.

In May and October 2024, Feng Tang held his 5th round of calligraphy exhibition, "I Am a Cat 我是猫", in Shenzhen and Beijing, respectively. The Beijing exhibition was particularly notable for pioneering the Citywalk-style of viewing exhibitions. It showcased nearly 60 of Feng Tang's recent artworks, which used calligraphic small paintings to explore human society from a cat's perspective and delve into philosophical reflections inspired by cats. The whimsical interaction between cats and temples created a unique sense of Zen.

To commemorate the first anniversary of his mother's passing, Feng Tang held his 6th round of exhibition, titled "I, the Unfading Flower 作為花我從來沒敗過", from March to June 2025 in Beijing. The exhibition showcased 100 of his mother's personal belongings, alongside 166 calligraphic works inspired by her words, and paintings based on the most emotionally resonant details from photographs, dreams and memories. Through its curatorial design, the exhibition explored themes of life and death, the bond between mother and child, and she power.

In April 2026, Feng Tang held his 7th round of exhibition "The Temple of Oneness 一人寺" in Beijing. Featuring 130 new calligraphic works, paintings and artifacts centered on themes of self-reflection, spirituality and inner cultivation.

== Business ==
In addition to being an artist, Feng Tang is also a business professional. After earning his MBA degree from Emory University, he began his career as a management consultant at McKinsey & Company in 2000, rising to the level of global partner after six years.

In 2009, Feng Tang joined China Resources (Holdings) Co., Limited as General Manager of the Strategy Management Department. A few months later, he developed a strategy to explore the healthcare industry in China. In October 2011, he was appointed as the founding CEO of CR Healthcare. His mission was to build China's largest corporate-managed hospital network with advanced management and medical capabilities, seeing this as a way to provide better healthcare service to all, and to revolutionize China's mostly state-owned medical industry. Under his leadership, the company expanded rapidly, conducted many trailblazing projects in reforming state owned hospitals, and sparked a trend in private medical institution investments in China. One of the projects, the structural reform of Kunming Children's Hospital, stands as the textbook example on reformation and privatization of public hospitals in China to this day.

From 2015, Feng Tang transitioned to investment, focusing again on the healthcare industry, and became the Senior Managing Director of CITIC Capital. Trained as a clinical doctor, Feng Tang aspired to improved China's healthcare system, making significant contributions to the sector's growth and reform over the past two decades.

Over the years, Feng Tang has made his mark in the business world. In 2019, he began writing management books, offering unique insights into self-management, team management, and achieving sustained business success. In 2020, he was asked to create a series of online audio lectures based on his management books. He later developed his own theory on getting things done and established his "Getting things done" commercial school.

== Influence ==
As an influencer, Feng Tang frequently publishes essays and anecdotes on social media. He has over 10 million followers on Weibo, one of the most important Chinese social media websites. Feng Tang has been a columnist for GQ magazine in China for ten years, during which time his articles appeared in every issue of the magazine, and his portrait even appeared on the cover once. Through these articles, he promotes a more mindful lifestyle, a more naturalistic and contained aesthetics, and a better appreciation of everyday events and objects. He even provides an advice for relationships, careers, and overcoming obstacles in life, with style and humour.
