= Ine Lamers =

Dutch photographer and video installation artist

- Ine Lamers in own studio in Rotterdam at GRAW25
- Born: Ardina Gerarda Maria Lamers; 15 May 1954 (age 72); Wijchen
- Occupations: Photographer and video installation artist
- Website: http://inelamers.nl/

Ardina Gerarda Maria "Ine" Lamers (born 15 May 1954) is a Dutch photographer and video installation artist, who is specialized in ilfochrome photography and chromogenic color print.

Born in Wijchen in Gelderland, Lamers received her art education at the AKI (now AKI ArtEZ Academy for Art & Design Enschede, part of Artez) from 1983 to 1987, and at the Jan Van Eyck Academie in Maastricht from 1987 to 1989. After her graduation, she settled as independent artist in Rotterdam in 1990. Since 1995, she lectured at the Piet Zwart Institute, and in the same year she was awarded the Hendrik Chabot Prize.

== Selected publications ==
- Lidwien van de Ven, Paul Ouwerkerk, Ine Lamers, Mels van Zutphen, Thomas Lenden, Jan van Eyck Akademie, 1987.
- Villa Constance: Geert van de Camp, Herman Lamers, Ine Lamers, Lidwien van de Ven, Museum Jan Cunen, 1994.
- Faces and names: Ine Lamers, 1996.
- Ine Lamers, Elbrig de Groot. Ine Lamers. Distributed Art Pub Incorporated, 2002.

== Filmography ==
- 2000 Conspiracy Spray (directed by Ine Lamers, Karl Riedl film editor)
- 2002 1 or 2 things I know about Chisinau (directed by Ine Lamers, Karl Riedl film editor)
- 2004 Not She (directed by Ine Lamers, Karl Riedl film editor)
