= Lost in Beijing =

- Film poster
- Directed by: Li Yu
- Written by: Fang Li; Li Yu
- Produced by: Fang Li
- Starring: Tony Leung Ka-fai; Fan Bingbing; Tong Dawei; Elaine Jin
- Cinematography: Wang Yu
- Edited by: Zeng Jian
- Music by: Peyman Yazdanian
- Production company: Laurel Films
- Distributed by: Films Distribution
- Release date: February 16, 2007 (Berlinale)
- Running time: 112 minutes
- Country: China
- Language: Mandarin

Lost in Beijing (Chinese: 苹果; lit. 'apple') is a 2007 Chinese drama film directed by Li Yu and starring Tony Leung Ka-fai, Fan Bingbing, Tong Dawei, and Elaine Jin. It had its international premiere at the 2007 Berlin International Film Festival on February 16, 2007. Lost in Beijing is director Li Yu's third feature film after the lesbian-themed Fish and Elephant (2002) and the drama Dam Street (2005).

Lost in Beijing was produced by Laurel Films, a small independent production company owned by Fang Li and based in Beijing, and is being released internationally by the French company Films Distribution. Distribution in the United States was picked up by New Yorker Films.

Like many films that touch on the underbelly of Chinese society (see for example, Li Yang's Blind Shaft or Blind Mountain, or Wang Xiaoshuai's Beijing Bicycle), Li Yu's tale of prostitution, blackmail, and rape in modern-day Beijing has been plagued with censorship problems. After nearly a year of delays, the film was finally banned by Chinese authorities in January 2008.

== Plot ==
Liu Pingguo and her husband, An Kun are a young migrant couple from northeast of China who have moved to Beijing for a better life. Pingguo and An Kun live in a dilapidated apartment eking out their existence working menial jobs. An Kun works as a window washer, while his wife works in the Golden Basin Massage Parlor as a foot masseuse. Golden Basin is owned and operated by Lin Dong, a successful businessman and unabashed womanizer who is also from Guangdong Province. His wife, Wang Mei practices Chinese medicine, but is unable to have children due to infertility.

When Pingguo's best friend, Xiao Mei, assaults a customer, she is quickly fired by Lin Dong. Pingguo, wishing to commiserate, takes her friend out and becomes drunk on bai jiu. Returning to the Golden Basin, she passes out in an empty office. Lin Dong attempts to make a pass at her, which quickly turns into rape and is witnessed by An Kun, who is washing the building's windows. An Kun begins a campaign of harassment against Lin Dong, defacing his Mercedes-Benz, and attempting to blackmail him for ¥20,000. While Lin Dong ignores his wife, An Kun goes directly to Wang Mei, who rather than acquiescing, seduces him instead.

Soon, it is discovered that Pingguo is pregnant, though neither An Kun nor Lin Dong can be certain of who is the father. Lin Dong, however, sees an opportunity to make things right with his barren wife as well as to settle things with Pingguo and her husband. Soon, the two men have concocted a scheme wherein An Kun initially receives ¥20,000 for his mental suffering. If the child has Lin Dong's blood type, he will go home with the massage-parlor owner and An Kun will receive ¥100,000. If the baby is An Kun's, no money will be exchanged, but Pingguo and An Kun keep the baby. Moreover, if Lin Dong again sleeps with Pingguo, half of his assets will go to Wang Mei in a divorce proceeding. During these negotiations, Pingguo remains conspicuously silent. She also plans on having an abortion, but decides against it.

As the baby is carried to term, Lin Dong becomes more and more attached to the idea that he will at last be a father. When the baby is born however, An Kun discovers that it is indeed his child. Unable to turn down the money, he manages to convince Lin Dong that it is his son, allowing him to collect the ¥120,000. Although, seeing how happy Lin Dong is with the baby, An Kun grows increasingly jealous and kidnaps the baby before being arrested and jailed. After being released (presumably by Wang Mei, who has decided to divorce her husband), An Kun attempts to "repurchase" his child, to which Lin Dong promptly refuses. Pingguo, who had moved into Lin Dong's home after birth with a nursemaid, gathers the money that An Kun had returned, and leaves the apartment, now free with her child. The film then ends as Lin Dong and An Kun attempt to search for her, only to have their car break down on a busy Beijing highway.

== Cast ==
- Tony Leung Ka-fai as Lin Dong, Pingguo's employer, the owner of the massage parlor, the Golden Basin. For Lin Dong's backstory, Fang Li and Li Yu decided to make his character a nouveau riche businessman, but also a Beijing outsider. Hailing from the southern province of Guangdong, Lin Dong has moved to Beijing to become the owner of one of the first successful foot massage parlors after a successful stint as a restaurateur in his home province.
- Fan Bingbing as Liu Pingguo, a young woman from the countryside who works as a foot masseuse in a massage parlor in Beijing. Director Li Yu has indicated that both Pingguo and her husband An Kun are from poor families in China's northeast, who have come to Beijing for better jobs.
- Tong Dawei as An Kun, Pingguo's husband, a window washer.
- Elaine Jin as Wang Mei, Lin Dong's wife. Her inability to bear children leaves the marriage with Lin Dong strained. Wang Mei's character is also meant to be originally from the south, and she is the daughter of a government official.
- Zeng Meihuizi as Xiao Mei, a friend and fellow masseuse with Pingguo.

== Release ==
=== Berlin premiere controversy ===
Originally scheduled for a market screening on February 2 and a general screening on February 16 at the 2007 Berlin International Film Festival, it soon emerged that the film and its producers had run afoul of Chinese censors who demanded 15 cuts of scenes that depicted sex and gambling. Initially, the filmmakers agreed to compromise and accepted 65% of the cuts suggested by the censors. Additional complaints from the censors, however, were met with frustration from producer Fang Li, who made it clear that further cuts would damage the film's message.

By February 7, it appeared that the filmmakers and the censors had reached a compromise. Beijing would allow the film to be screened if a further fifteen minutes were cut, including several seemingly innocuous scenes depicting China's national flag, Tiananmen Square, and even a scene of a Mercedes-Benz driving through a puddle-filled pothole. Ultimately Berlin organizers screened an apparently uncut version at both screenings.

Despite its troubles with the Chinese authorities, the film nevertheless obtained an international distributor from the Paris-based Films Distribution.

=== Domestic release problems ===
Even after its international premiere, Lost in Beijing continued to run into censorship issues in China. In particular, a high-level meeting of Communist Party officials in the fall of 2007, as well as the run-up to the Olympics led to repeated delays for the domestic release of the film. Along with other titles (such as Li Yang's Blind Mountain), Lost in Beijing saw its release date pushed aside in favor of "patriotic" films.

While continuing to face issues on the Mainland, Lost in Beijing did manage to be released in Hong Kong in November 2007. Hong Kong, with its own cinema censorship system independent of Mainland China and relatively less susceptible to government intervention, was so far the only place this film could officially reach the Chinese audience. The film received "Level Three: Persons Aged 18 and Above Only" (III) rating in Hong Kong motion picture rating system for its sexual content.

Back on the Mainland, prospects for a release continued to decline. While the film was briefly released on a limited basis in Beijing in December 2007, the version of the film was heavily edited and known as "Apple". The film's screening license was eventually revoked a month later on January 3, 2008. Day later, the State Administration of Radio, Film, and Television (SARFT) officially banned the film accusing the filmmakers of releasing the deleted scenes on the internet, for inappropriate promotion of the film, and also for the film's unauthorized screening in Berlin the year before. SARFT also banned the production company Laurel Films and director Li Yu from filmmaking for two years.

=== American release ===
Though Lost in Beijing had played briefly in the Tribeca Film Festival, it did not see a commercial release until a limited run in New York beginning on January 25, 2008.

== Reception ==
Besides Berlin, Lost in Beijing has screened at a handful of important film festivals, including the 2007 Bangkok International Film Festival, where it won a Special Jury Prize, and the 2007 Tribeca Film Festival where it garnered an honorable mention for screenplay.

Critics, meanwhile, were reserved in their praise. While many agreed the leads' performances are well played, a few have argued that the film's plot, and particularly some dramatic leaps of faith, were difficult to swallow. Ray Bennett of The Hollywood Reporter, for example, wrote that the film's "plot doesn't really hold up" and that "[while] the cast does well, [...] the demands of sudden changes of emotion are a bit overwhelming." Derek Elley of Variety, however, appears to accept the dramatic licenses taken, and instead focuses on the film's excellent technical credits, and the performances of the four main leads.

Among the Mandarin-speaking audience though, the film has gained much attention and notoriety, first for its explicit sexual content which some have called unnecessary (while some argue are integral to the film's message), and for its scathing social commentary. "Underground film", a Wuhan-based underground Chinese film magazine rated it the "Best" boundary pushing film in China of 2007.

With its commercial release in the United States in early 2008, the film's profile was raised, although critics continued to be ambivalent in their reviews. Review databases like Rotten Tomatoes reported only 45% of reviews were positive as of January 27 while Metacritic reported a rating of 58 indicating "mixed or average reviews". American critics moreover, like those of Variety and The Hollywood Reporter, continued to note the film's difficult to swallow leaps of faith. A.O. Scott, of The New York Times, for example, praises the film's acting (particularly Elaine Jin and Tony Leung), but notes that these performances serve to cut "against the schematic artifice of its story." Other critics, like Richard Brody of The New Yorker focused on the clear social criticism of the film, noting that "[t]hough Li's direction is slapdash and her script (co-written with the producer, Fang Li) disheveled, the film's furious protest is unmistakable."

== Alternate versions ==
Lost in Beijing's brief release in China consisted of a version very different from the versions seen in Berlin and in the United States. Complying with SARFT demands, the filmmakers excised nearly 20 minutes from the film, including an entire subplot wherein Elaine Jin's character has an affair with Tong Dawei's younger man as revenge for her husband's infidelities. Other sensitive topics such as tangential references to prostitution were also cut, as was the murder of Xiao Mei, one of Pingguo's friends and fellow masseuse. Some of the changes seemed minor, but were meant to further align the film with the government's conceptions of justice and fairness. Pingguo, for example, does not accept money at the end of the Chinese version, so that she would leave without having had her character compromised.

The very last scene in the New Yorker Films DVD release ends simply with Pingguo leaving Lin Dong's apartment, presumedly to start a life on her own. There is no reference to Lin Dong and An Kun following her.

== See also ==
- Summer Palace, director Lou Ye's 2006 film, also produced by Fang Li's Laurel Films and also banned by Chinese authorities.
- Banned films, mainland China
- Censorship in the People's Republic of China
- Nudity in film (East Asian cinema since 1929)
