= Laurel Films =

- Type: Production company
- Industry: Chinese cinema
- Founded: 2000; 26 years ago
- Headquarters: Beijing, China
- Key people: Fang Li

Laurel Films was founded in 2000 by Fang Li, as an outgrowth of his earth sciences technological company Laurel Industrial Company, Inc.

The company is dedicated to bringing together a new generation of Chinese filmmakers to produce and promote films with high production standards, artistic quality, and commercial value. Laurel Films has produced many outstanding films, including Everyday Somewhere, Fairy Tales, Lost in Beijing, Please Vote for Me, Double Exposure, The Continent, Ever Since We Loved, Somewhere Only We Know, Duckweed, The Brink, Sunshine Thieves, Old Town Girl, The Sinking of the Lisbon Maru and more. At the same time, Laurel Films has diversified its production services and for many years has been producing Sina Entertainment's The Most Beautiful Performances.

Over more than a decade of steady development, Laurel Films has built its own film factory industrial chain. By integrating resources and facilitating highly efficient collaboration, the company maximizes cost savings and reduces production time. The Laurel Film Factory industrial chain is composed of a number of film production companies that Laurel Films either controls or participates in. Its business scope covers script development, artist management, film editing, color grading, sound production, art concept design, set construction, film music services, aerial cinematography, and more.

Laurel Films enjoys a strong reputation in the industry for its artistic creativity, and it also places great emphasis on film marketing and distribution. The company has established excellent cooperative relationships with major international distribution partners, film festivals, and television networks, greatly expanding its films’ revenue potential and global recognition.

Selected Awards of Films Produced by Laurel Films

2001, An Yang Baby – Director: Wang Chao Nominated for the Caméra d’Or (Best First Feature) at the 54th Cannes Film Festival.

2004, Everyday Somewhere – Director: Wang Chao Won Best Film and Best Director at the 25th Nantes Three Continents Festival.

2005, Fairy Tales – Director: Li Yu Won the European Film Award at the 62nd Venice International Film Festival.

2007, Lost in Beijing – Director: Li Yu Nominated for the Golden Bear (Best Feature) at the 57th Berlin International Film Festival.

2010, Please Vote for Me – Director: Li Yu Won Best Artistic Contribution and Best Actress at the 23rd Tokyo International Film Festival.

2011, Double Exposure – Director: Li Yu Won Best Actress (Fan Bingbing) and Best Film Music at the 9th Huading Awards.

2014, The Continent – Director: Han Han Won Best Original Song at the 51st Golden Horse Awards.

2015, Ever Since We Loved – Director: Li Yu Won the Golden Angel Award at the 11th Chinese American Film Festival.

2015, Somewhere Only We Know – Director: Li Ruijun Won Outstanding Children's Film at the 16th China Huabiao Film Awards.

2017, Duckweed – Director: Han Han Nominated for Best Chinese Film at the 37th Hong Kong Film Awards.

2024 The Sinking of the Lisbon Maru- Director：Fang Li Golden Rooster Awards (China) — Best Documentary/Science & Education Film

Shanghai International Film Festival It premiered at the Shanghai International Film Festival and was selected as the opening film of the festival.

The film was chosen as China's submission for the Academy Award for Best International Feature Film.

Asian World Film Festival Selection It was also selected for screening at the Asian World Film Festival.

== Productions ==
- The Orphan of Anyang (2001, Wang Chao)
- Day and Night (2004, Wang Chao)
- Dam Street (2005, Li Yu)
- Summer Palace (2006, Lou Ye)
- Lost in Beijing (2007, Li Yu)
- Buddha Mountain (2010, Li Yu)
- Double Xposure (2012, Li Yu)
- The Continent (2014, Han Han)
- Ever Since We Love (2015, Li Yu)
