= Philip Gröning =

German film director

Philip Gröning (born 7 April 1959, in Düsseldorf) is a German director, documentary film maker and screenwriter.

== Career ==
Gröning was raised in Germany and U.S., but also traveled extensively. He studied Medicine and Psychology, before beginning in the cinema with some acting. In 1986, he began doing his own films. His first documentary was The Last Picture Taken.

In 2005, he gained acclaim for Into Great Silence. His 2013 film The Police Officer's Wife was screened in the main competition section at the 70th Venice International Film Festival and won the Special Jury Prize.

Philip Groening was:

- the jury president of the Orizzonti section at the Venice international film festival in 2006;
- member of the jury at the Filmfest Munich in 2009;
- member of the main international jury at Venice international filmfestival in 2014; and
- jury member at the Message of Man Festival in St. Petersburg in 2014.

He has been lecturing at the Baden-Württemberg Film Academy since 2001 and is a professor at the International Film School in Cologne.

He is a member of: the German Film Academy, the European Film Academy and the Bavarian Academy of the fine Arts.

== Filmography ==
=== As actor ===
- 1984 : Nebel jagen
- 1999 : Virtual Vampire
- 2020 : Miss Marx

=== As director ===
- 1988 : Summer
- 1992 : The Terrorists!
- 1998 : Philosophie
- 2000 : Love, Money, Love
- 2005 : Into Great Silence
- 2013 : The Police Officer's Wife
- 2018 : My Brother's Name Is Robert and He Is an Idiot

== Awards ==
- 2005 Bayerischer Filmpreis ("Bavarian Film Awards") Prize for Best Documentary for Into Great Silence.
- 2013 Seville European Film Festival Best Actress for The Police Officer's Wife.
- 2014 Vilnius International Film Festival Best Actress for The Police Officer's Wife.
- 2018 Sitges Film Festival Best Director for My brother's name is Robert and he is an idiot.
- 2018 Gent Explore Zone award for My brother's name is Robert and he is an idiot.
