= Day and Night (2004 Chinese film) =

- Film poster
- Directed by: Wang Chao
- Written by: Wang Chao
- Produced by: Fang Li; Sylvain Bursztejn
- Cinematography: Yi Huhewula
- Edited by: Zhou Xinxia
- Music by: Qin Wenchen
- Distributed by: Worldwide Sales: Onoma; International theatrical: Rosem Films
- Release date: May 14, 2004 (Cannes)
- Running time: 95 minutes
- Country: China
- Language: Mandarin

Day and Night (Chinese: 日日夜夜; pinyin: Rìrì yèyè) is a 2004 Chinese film, and the second film by Sixth Generation writer-director Wang Chao. It is also known, less accurately, as Night and Day. The film constitutes the second entry in Wang Chao's loose trilogy on modern China. It was preceded by Wang's 2001 debut, The Orphan of Anyang, and would be followed by Luxury Car in 2006. The film is a Chinese-French co-production between Fang Li's Laurel Films and Sylvain Busztejn's Rosem Pictures in association with the China Film Fourth Group and Arte France Cinéma; Laurel and Rosem would later reunite to produce Luxury Car.

== Synopsis ==
Day and Night tells the story of a miner, Li Guangsheng (Liu Lei), in a fictional northern Chinese city who carries on an illicit affair with the wife of his friend and father figure (played by Orphan's Sun Guilin). When his friend is killed in a cave-in, the miner is wracked with guilt and takes it upon himself to end the affair, rebuild the mine, and help his friend's mentally disabled son find a wife.

== Production ==
The film was shot in Wuchuan County, Inner Mongolia, near the provincial capital of Hohhot.

== Cast ==
- Liu Lei as Li Guangsheng, the main character, a miner in northern China.
- Sun Guilin as Zhongmin, Li Guangsheng's friend and father-figure.
- Wang Lan
- Xiao Ming as A-Fu, Zhongmin's son.
- Wang Zheng
- Zhang Guangjie

== Reception ==
Day and Night premiered in several major international film festivals, notably the 2004 Adelaide Film Festival but also at Pusan and Hong Kong. However, the film would ultimately fail to garner the same level of acclaim that Wang's The Orphan of Anyang was able to, though it was more technically polished than the decidedly low-budget Orphan. Critics such as Derek Elley derided the film as a "curiously lifeless item that falls short of its seemingly mythic intent." As such, it is generally considered a less successful film than its predecessor.

The film did manage to garner one major award, however, with the Golden Montgolfiere at the 2004 Nantes Three Continents Festival.
