= Cho Sung-hyung =

German filmmaker

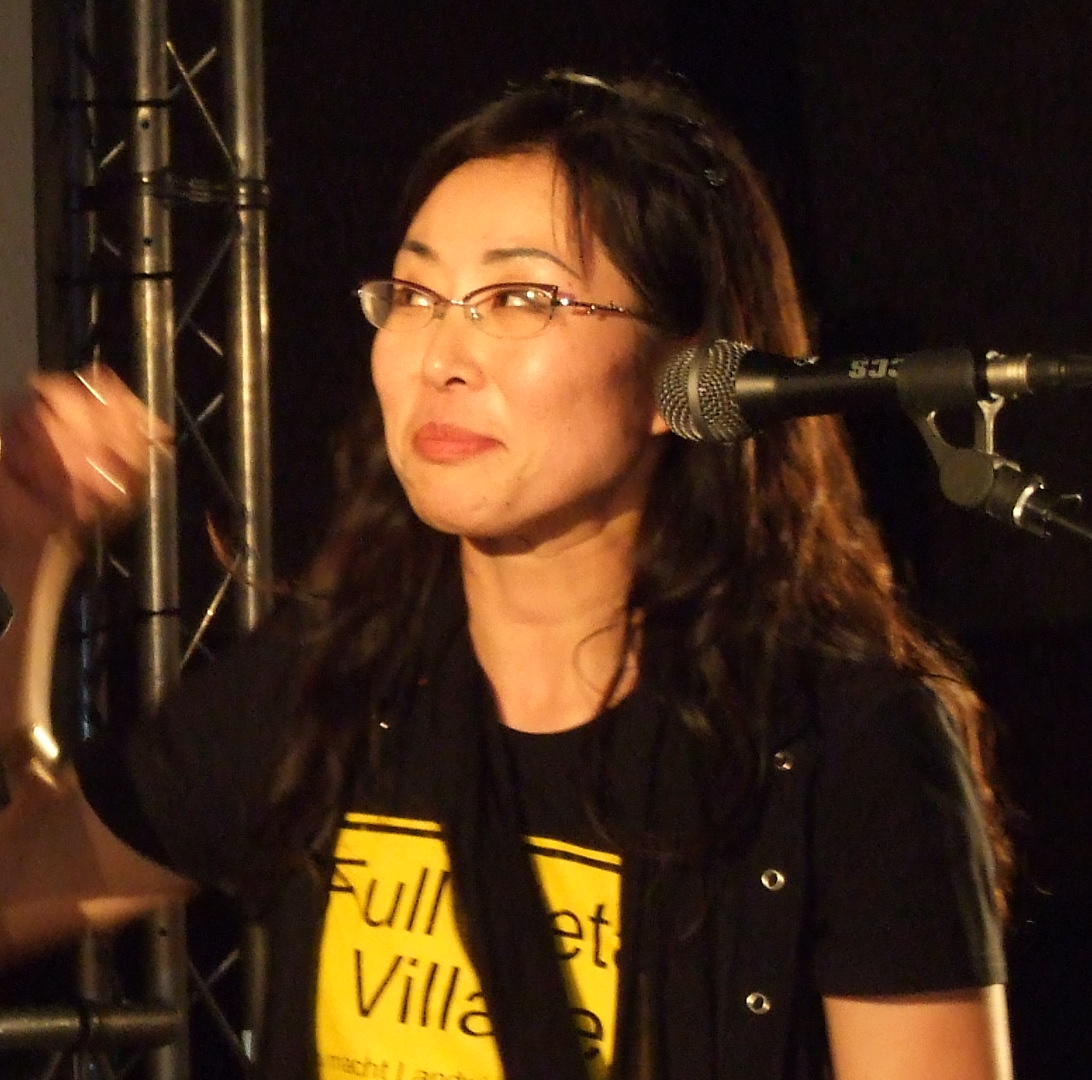
- Born: Cho Sung-Hyung; 1966 (age 59–60); Busan, South Korea
- Occupations: Director, editor, film maker and professor
- Years active: 1990–present
- Known for: Full Metal Village

Korean name
- Hangul: 조성형
- RR: Jo Seonghyeong
- MR: Cho Sŏnghyŏng

Cho Sung-hyung is a German film maker, director, editor and professor living and working in Germany with South Korean roots. She got German citizenship in 2012 for her documentary My Brothers and Sisters in the North.

== Biography ==
Cho was born 1966 in Busan, and grew up in Busan. When she was five years old, her mother moved to West Germany, where she worked as a nurse. Cho received a BA in Mass Communications Studies from Yonsei University. In 1990, Cho moved to Marburg in Germany to pursue an MA in art history, media studies and philosophy at the University of Marburg. She continued with post-graduate studies in Theater Film and Media Sciences at Goethe University Frankfurt and a course in electronic images at Hochschule für Gestaltung Offenbach am Main.

Between 2004 and 2007, she had taught Editoring, Documentary and Dramaturgy at SAE Institute and was between 2008 and 2009, an assistant lecturer at the University of Darmstadt. Since 2011, Cho teaches as a regular professor The Art of Film/Movie Making at the University for Visual Arts of Saar in Saarbrücken, Germany.

She worked as a freelance editor and led editing seminars at the Filmhaus Frankfurt and SAE Institute. She also directed documentaries and music videos. Since 2018, she has been a member of the jury of the Federal Festival of Young Film at St. Ingbert.

== Film career ==
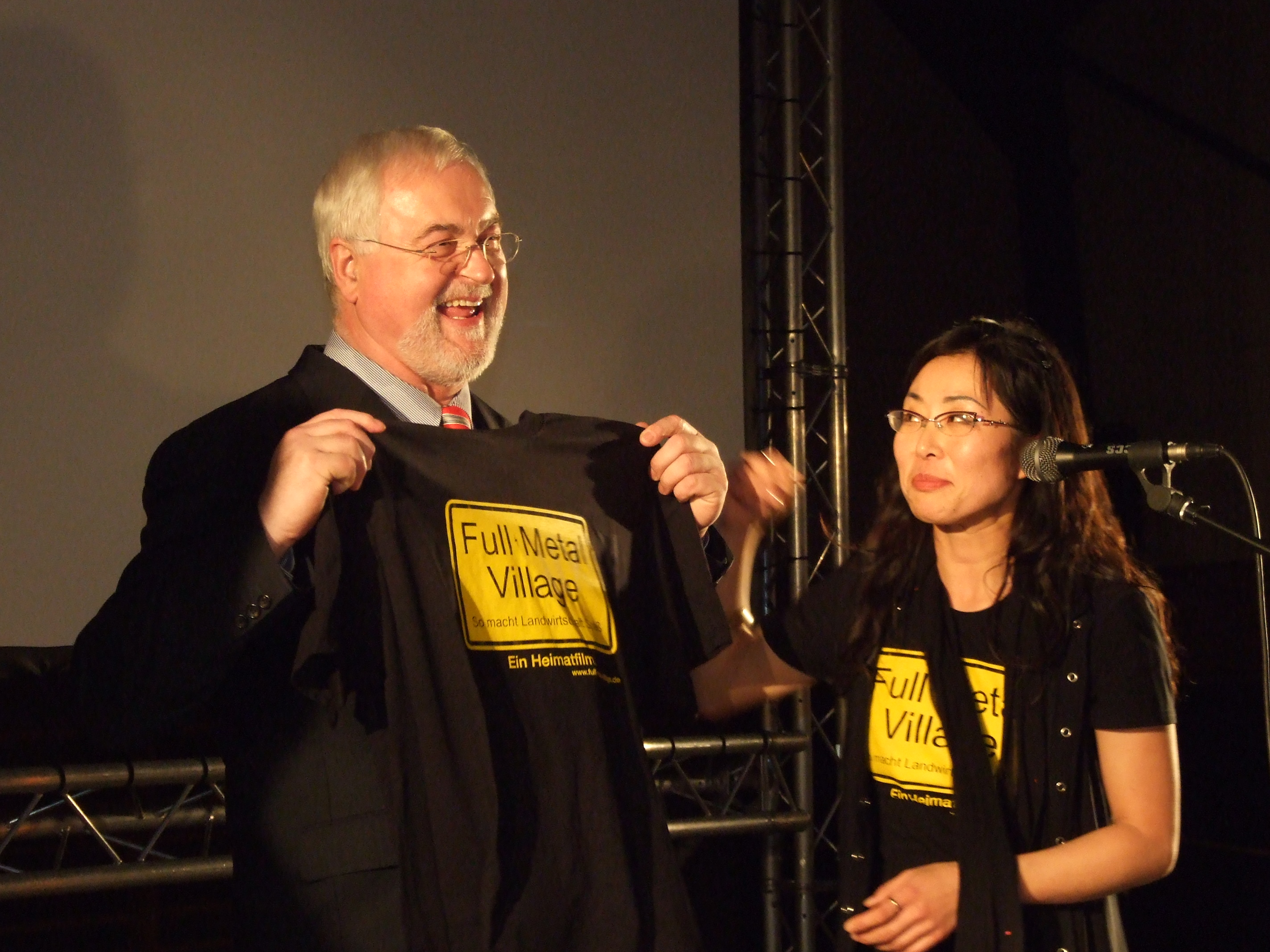
Cho Sung-Hyung (right) and Minister-president of Schleswig-Holstein Peter Harry Carstensen presented the T-Shirt of her documentary "Full Metal Village"

Cho was an assistant editor for the German television series Ein Fall für zwei, also working on documentaries and music videos. Her documentary Full Metal Village received the Hessian Film Award in 2006 and the Max Ophüls Prize and was named best documentary by the Guild of German Art House Cinemas in 2007.

In 2016, Cho had filmed and was starring in the documentary Meine Brüder und Schwestern im Norden (My Brothers and Sisters in the North). She was the first South Korean director who was allowed to visit North Korea after Korean War without being charged for treason by South Korea, because she has a German passport. She gave up South Korean citizenship and took the German one just for making this documentary and getting a visa and the permission of shooting from North Korea.

== Selected filmography ==
=== Director & Editor ===
- Full Metal Village (2006)
- Home from Home (2009)
- 11 Freundinnen (2011)
- Endstation Der Sehnsuchte (2012)
- Verliebt, Verlobt, Verloren (Far East Devotion – Love Letters from Pyongyang) (2015)
- Zwei Stimmen aus Korea (Two Voices From Korea) (2015)
- My Brothers and Sisters in the North (2016)
- The Woman Who Shot the Madonna - Ulrike Rosenbach (2026) with Yvonne Lachmann & AG Rosenbach

=== Editor Only ===
- Freudenhaus (2001)
- Verirrte Eskimos (2003)
- Parzifal in Isfahan (2004)

== Awards ==
=== Won ===
- 2006: Schleswig-Holstein Film Award for Full Metal Village
- 2006: Hessian Film Award for Full Metal Village
- 2007: Max Ophüls Award for Full Metal Village as first documentary ever
- 2007: Guild of German Art House Cinemas Award for Full Metal Village
- 2007: Award for advancing the upcoming artists of the DEFA Foundation
- 2009: Best regional long film of 2. Lichter Film Festival for Endstation der Sehnsüchte
- 2016: Best regional long film of 9. Lichter Film Festival for Meine Brüder und Schwesterin im Norden
- 2016: Best documentary film at 26. Filmkunstfest Mecklenburg-Vorpommern for Meine Brüder und Schwesterin im Norden

=== Norminated ===
- 2007 Golden Eye Award at Zurich Film Festival for Full Metal Village
- 2016 Best documentary film at Hessischen Filmpreis for "Meine Brüder und Schwestern im Norden"
- 2017 Gimme Preis for "Zwei Stimmen aus Korea" https://www.grimme-preis.de/archiv/2017/nominierungen/n/d/zwei-stimmen-aus-korea-zdf3sat
