= Journey to the Land of the Traveller =

- Directed by: Bahman Kiarostami
- Written by: Abbas Kiarostami; Jafar Panahi; Jean-Pierre Limosin; Hassan Darabi
- Release date: 1993
- Country: Iran
- Language: Persian

Journey to the Land of the Traveller (Persian: سفری به دیار مسافر, Safari be diār-e mosāfer) is a 1993 Iranian documentary film directed by Bahman Kiarostami.

== See also ==
- List of Iranian films
