= Zhu Jie =

Chinese handball player (born 1978)

Zhu Jie (born 30 January 1978) is a Chinese handball player who competed in the 2008 Summer Olympics. He was born in Huainan.
