= Chuiyangliu =

Residential community in Beijing, China

Coordinates: 25°28′N 103°19′E

Chuiyangliu (Chinese: 垂杨柳) is a residential community administrated by the Shuangjing subdistrict, and is located in Chaoyang District of Beijing, China.

== History ==
The housing in the area was built in the 1950s. An urban renewal project was planned during 2002-2008 due to many buildings having safety hazards, including one building burning down in 2018. As of 2021, the project has not yet began construction.
