= Wang Chao (director) =

Chinese film director and screenwriter

- Wang Chao in Cannes Film Festival 2014
- Born: January 21, 1964 (age 62); Nanjing, Jiangsu
- Occupation: Film director
- Awards: FIPRESCI Prize (Chicago); 2001 Orphan of Anyang; Entrevues Grand Prix; 2001 Orphan of Anyang; Kerala Golden Crow Pheasant; 2002 Orphan of Anyang; Golden Montgolfiere; 2004 Day and Night; Prix Un Certain Regard; 2006 Luxury Car; Jury Prize for Best Screenplay; 2022 A Woman

Wang Chao (Chinese: 王超; born January 21, 1964, in Nanjing) is a Chinese film director and screenwriter, sometimes considered part of the loosely defined "sixth generation." Wang began his career serving as an assistant director to the fifth generation auteur, Chen Kaige, working with the elder director on epics like Farewell My Concubine and The Emperor and the Assassin. At the same time, he began to write fiction including several short stories and novellas, one of which would later go on to serve as the basis of Wang's directorial debut, The Orphan of Anyang.

With Orphan, Wang Chao would begin what was the first film of a trilogy of films based on modern life in China. He completed the trilogy with 2004's Day and Night and 2006's Luxury Car.

His 2014 film Fantasia was selected to compete in the Un Certain Regard section at the 2014 Cannes Film Festival.

== Filmography ==
Year	English Title	Chinese Title	Notes
2001	The Orphan of Anyang	安阳的孤儿	Winner of the Golden Crow Pheasant at the 2002 International Film Festival of Kerala
2004	Day and Night	日日夜夜	Winner of the Golden Montgolfiere at the 2004 Three Continents Festival
2006	Luxury Car	江城夏日	Winner of the Prix un certain regard at the 2006 Cannes Film Festival
2009	Memory of Love	重来	
2014	Fantasia	幻想曲	
2018	Looking for Rohmer	寻找罗麦	
2022	A Woman	孔秀	Winner of the Jury Prize for Best Screenplay at the 70th San Sebastián International Film Festival
