= Bahman Kiarostami =

Iranian film director

- بهمن کیارستمی
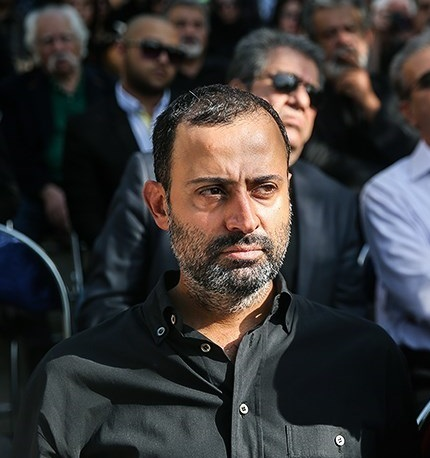
- Bahman Kiarostami at the funeral of his father, Abbas, 10 July 2016
- Born: 11 August 1978 (age 48); Tehran, Iran
- Occupations: Filmmaker, cinematographer, film editor
- Parent(s): Abbas Kiarostami; Parvin Amir-Gholi

Bahman Kiarostami (Persian: بهمن کیارستمی; born 11 August 1978, in Tehran) is an Iranian film director, cinematographer, film editor and film producer. He is the son of the late critically acclaimed Abbas Kiarostami. The main theme in Kiarostami's films are art and music.

== Filmography ==
=== Director ===
Year	English title	Persian title	Length	Notes
2018	Exodus	اکسدوس	77 minutes	Documentary about the relationship between a recession and the impact on Afghan migrants returning to Afghanistan from Iran.
2015	Lamentation of Romantic Revolutionary for the Obvious Charm of the Bourgeoisie	مرثیه‌ی یک انقلابی رمانتیک برای جذابیت آشکار بورژوازی	20 minutes	
2014	Monir	منیر	54 minutes	Documentary about Monir Shahroudy Farmanfarmaian, directed by Kiarostami
2013	Kahrizak, Four Views	کهریزک٬ چهار نگاه	86 minutes	Documentary created by four directors each presenting a view of the Kahrizak Charity Centre. Directed, cinematography and written by Kiarostami.
2006	Re-enactment	شبیه‌خوانی	50 minutes	
2005	Persian Garden	باغ ایرانی	48 minutes	
2004	Pilgrimage	زیارت	52 minutes	Documentary about a pilgrimage many Iranians made after Saddam Hussain was removed from power in Iraq. Directed by Kiarostami.
2004	The Kamancheh Player	دو کمانچه	46 minutes	Documentary about music, directed by Kiarostami
2003	Infidels	کفار	40 minutes	Short documentary
2002	I saw Shoosh	شوش را دیدم	7 minutes	
2001	Tabaki	تباکی	27 minutes	Short documentary about 'mourners for hire' in Iran. Directed by Kiarostami.
2001	The Light	نور	34 minutes	
1998	The Project	طرح	39 minutes	Documentary
1997	Journey to the Land of the Traveller	سفری به دیار مسافر	43 minutes	Written by Abbas Kiarostami, Jafar Panahi, Jean-Pierre Limosin, and Hassan Darabi, it was filmed in 1993 but released in 1997. Directed by Bahman Kiarostami.
1996	Morteza Momayez: Father of Iranian Contemporary Graphic Design	مرتضی ممیز		Documentary about Morteza Momayez

== Awards ==
- 2019 – Jury Award for Documentary Features, 30th annual New Orleans Film Festival, New Orleans, Louisiana, United States
- 2012 – Jury Award for Kahrizak, Four Views for the 9th Dubai International Film Festival, Dubai, United Arab Emirates
- 2004 – "Special Mention" honor for Pilgrimage (Zairat), 26th Festival des 3 Continents, Nantes, France
- 2003 – Best Director Award for The Light, Beirut Middle East Film Festival, Beirut, Lebanon
