= Into Great Silence =

- Promotional poster
- Directed by: Philip Gröning
- Written by: Philip Gröning
- Produced by: Philip Gröning
- Music by: monks of the Grande Chartreuse
- Production companies: Venturia Film SA; Bavaria Film GmbH; Arte/ZDF; Bayerischer Rundfunk; Televisione svizzera
- Distributed by: X Verleih AG (through Warner Bros. Pictures, Germany)
- Release dates: 4 September 2005 (Venice); 30 November 2005 (Germany); 20 December 2006 (France)
- Running time: 162 minutes
- Countries: France; Switzerland; Germany
- Languages: French; Latin

Into Great Silence (German: Die große Stille) is a 2005 documentary film directed by Philip Gröning. An international co-production between France, Switzerland, and Germany, it is an intimate portrayal of the everyday lives of Carthusian monks of the Grande Chartreuse, a monastery high in the French Alps (Chartreuse Mountains).

== Production ==
Gröning proposed the idea for the film to the monks in 1984, but the Carthusians said they wanted time to think about it. They responded to him 16 years later to say they were willing to permit him to shoot the movie if he was still interested. Gröning then came alone to live at the monastery, and to stay in the enclosure, where except for the order's aspirants no visitors are allowed, for a total of six months in 2002 and 2003. He filmed and recorded on his own, using no artificial light.

Afterwards, he spent two-and-a-half years editing the film. The final cut contains neither spoken commentary nor added sound effects. It consists of images and sounds that depict the rhythm of monastic life, with occasional intertitles displaying selections from Holy Scripture.

== Reception ==
The film has experienced a generally positive reception, with 89% of critics on Rotten Tomatoes responding with positive reviews. United States Conference of Catholic Bishops' Office for Film and Broadcasting listed Into Great Silence as one of the ten best films of 2007. The Carthusian monks themselves loved the film.

=== Awards ===
- Special Jury Prize at the 2006 Sundance Festival
- European Film Awards 2006, Documentary – Prix Arte
- Bavarian Film Award best documentary film, 2006
- Film Award of the German Association of Film Critics, best documentary film, 2006
- Film Award of the German Film Critics, best documentary film, 2006
- Film Award German Camera, best camera in a documentary film, 2006
- Jury Film Award for the best documentary film in the international festival contest of São Paulo/Rio de Janeiro
- International Ennio Flaiano Award of Pescara in Italy for best camera and best film

== See also ==
- Hermit
- Monasticism
- Camaldoli
- Desert Fathers
