= Li Yu (director) =

Chinese film director and screenwriter

- Born: December 2, 1973 (age 52); Shandong, China
- Occupations: Director, Screenwriter
- Years active: 1990s-present
- Awards: Elvira Notari Prize Prize; 2001 Fish and Elephant; Golden Lotus; 2006 Dam Street

Li Yu (Chinese: 李玉, born December 2, 1973) is a Chinese female film director and screenwriter. Li began her career in entertainment at a young age, serving as a presenter at a local TV station. After college, she worked for CCTV, where she directed television programs before moving on to documentaries and feature films.

== Directorial career ==
Li's first feature film, Fish and Elephant, debuted in 2001. It is purportedly the first mainland Chinese feature to address the subject of lesbianism. The film encountered issues during limited international screenings and was largely unseen by mainland Chinese audiences.

Her next film, Dam Street, faced fewer problems and garnered Li the Golden Lotus at the specialty Deauville Asian Film Festival in 2006.

In 2007, Li Yu's most high-profile film yet, Lost in Beijing, premiered at the 2007 Berlin International Film Festival. The result was over a year of controversy with the Chinese Film Bureau over both the appropriateness of that screening and the content of the film. Though briefly screened in a heavily edited state, the film was eventually banned outright, though it received limited releases abroad, including in the United States.

In 2010, Li Yu's coming-of-age film Buddha Mountain won the Award for Best Artistic Contribution at the 23rd Tokyo International Film Festival.

From being the host of a local channel station to a documentary director at CCTV, Li Yu was never satisfied with her career. Her documentary filmmaking style was known for making people uncomfortable, prompting her to turn one of her stories into a movie. However, she struggled to find a sponsor for her project and eventually decided to sell her house to invest in it herself. This decision led to her first movie, Fish and Elephant.

After completing the movie, Li and her boyfriend had to move into a friend's apartment because she had quit her job to pursue filmmaking. When her boyfriend couldn't bear the situation any longer, he called her uncle to convince Li to move out. Subsequently, Li had to borrow money from others to rent her own place. During this challenging period, she also had to restart her documentary work.

A friend from the United States sent Li's first movie, Fish and Elephant, to Venice, where it was unexpectedly selected to participate in a film festival. However, the staff lost one of the film tapes, causing the screening to be disjointed. International reporters laughed at the film during the screening. In frustration, Li stood up and shouted, "This is not my movie! Stop playing it. I quit this film festival!" She stormed out and began to cry. Eventually, the festival resolved the issue with the tapes sent by Li, but they did not include any subtitles. Despite the challenges, Li received an award for her contribution to female filmmaking.

== Awards ==
- 2012 - Won the 9th Guangzhou Student Film Festival Award for The Most Popular Director for Double Xposure
- 2011 - Won the Silver Screen Award for Best Asian Feature Film at the Singapore International Film Festival for Buddha Mountain
- 2011 - Won the Best Film Award at the Barcelona, Spain Casa Asia Film Festival Week (Asia Film Week) for Buddha Mountain
- 2010 - Won the Award for Best Artistic Contribution at the 23rd Tokyo International Film Festival for Buddha Mountain
- 2010 - Nominated for the Main Competition - Tokyo Award at the 23rd Tokyo International Film Festival for Buddha Mountain
- 2007 - Won the Jury Prize at the 5th Bangkok International Film Festival for Lost in Beijing
- 2007 - Won the Screenplay Honor Award at the 6th Tribeca Film Festival for Lost in Beijing
- 2007 - Nominated for the Golden Bear at the 57th Berlin International Film Festival in the Main Competition category for Lost in Beijing
- 2006 - Won the Best New Director Award at the 6th Chinese Film Media Awards for Dam Street
- 2005 - Won the International League Art Film Award at the 62nd Venice International Film Festival for Dam Street
- 2002 - Won the Promotion of Asian Cinema Award - Special mention at the 52nd Berlin International Film Festival for Fish and Elephant
- 2001 - Won the Film Award for Female Subjects at the 58th Venice International Film Festival for Fish and Elephant

== Filmography ==
Year	English Title	Chinese Title	Notes
1996	Sisters	姐姐	Documentary
1997	Stay and Hope	守望	Documentary
1998	Honor and Dreams	光荣与梦想	Documentary
2001	Fish and Elephant	今年夏天	Feature film debut
2005	Dam Street	红颜	2006 Golden Lotus winner
2007	Lost in Beijing	苹果	
2010	Buddha Mountain	观音山	
2012	Double Xposure	二次曝光	
2015	Ever Since We Love	万物生长	
2020	The Old Town Girls	兔子暴力	As producer
2021	Tiger Robbers	阳光劫匪	
2022	The Fallen Bridge	断·桥	
