= Magaly Solier =

Peruvian actress and singer

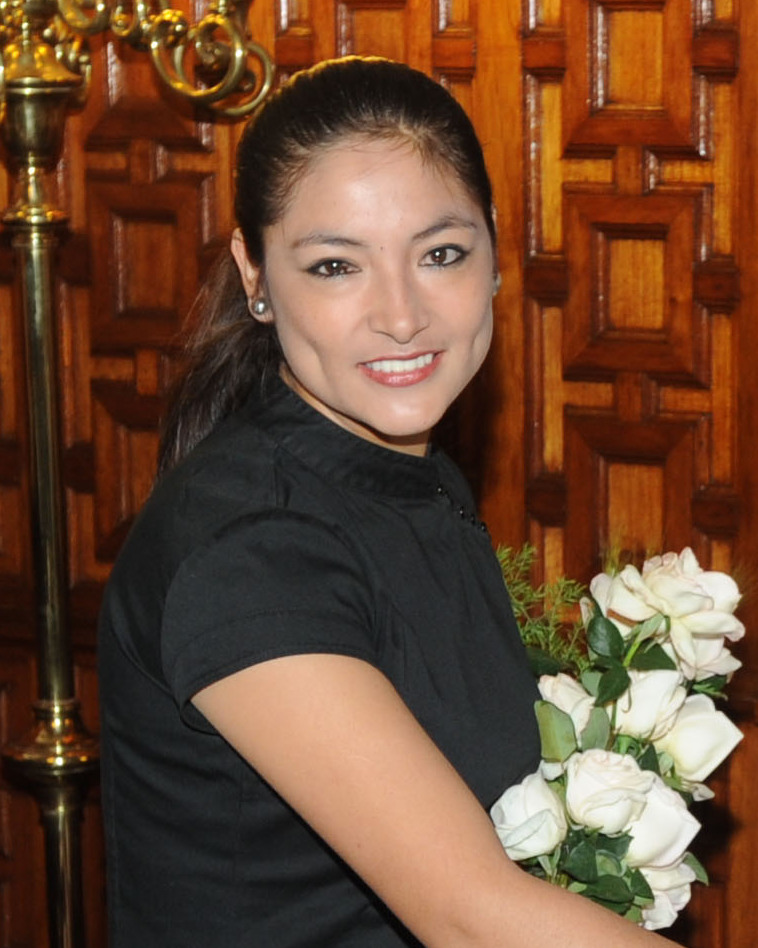
- Solier in 2010
- Born: Magaly Solier Romero; 11 June 1986 (age 40); Huanta, Ayacucho, Peru
- Occupations: Actress, singer
- Spouse: Erick Gomez (m. 2012)
- Children: 2

Magaly Solier Romero (born 11 June 1986) is a Peruvian actress and singer.

Magaly Solier Romero was born on 11 June 1986 in to a Quechua family, the province of Huanta, in the region of Ayacucho in Peru. She speaks the indigenous language of Quechua, as well as Spanish. Solier has publicly spoken about the importance of supporting indigenous language, traditions, and culture.

In 2003, she won the Festival de la Canción Ayacuchana with her singing. A year later, she made her debut as an actress in the film Madeinusa.

In June 2017, Solier was declared an Artist of Peace by UNESCO in Paris, France.

== Personal life ==
On 9 June 2012, Solier married cyclist Erick Plinio Mendoza Gómez in an intimate ceremony in Huamanga, Ayacucho. They became parents on 9 February 2013, when she gave birth to a son. In 2015, she announced her second pregnancy.

== Filmography ==
Year	Title	Country	Role	Director	Notes
2005	Madeinusa	Peru	Madeinusa	Claudia Llosa	
2007	Gods (Dioses)	Peru	Inés	Josué Méndez	
2008	La teta asustada	Peru	Fausta	Claudia Llosa	This film was the 2009 winner of the Golden Bear award at the Berlinale, as well as the award for "best actress" in the 2006 Cartagena de Indias Film Festival, and the 2006 Festivalissimo Montreal Ibero Latinoamerican Film Festival.
2008	Altiplano	Belgium	Saturnina	Peter Brosens and Jessica Woodworth	
2010	Amador	Spain	Marcela	Fernando León de Aranoa	This film was recognized in 2011 by the Andrei Tarkovsky International Film Festival, and won "best actress" from the 2011 Guadalajara International Film Festival.
2011	Blackthorn	Spain	Yana	Mateo Gil	
2012	Ñusta Huillac, La Tirana	Chile	Ñusta Huillac	Juan Luis Muñoz	
2012	Alfonsina y el mar	Chile	Warmi	David Sordella	
2012	Choleando	Peru	Herself	Roberto de la Puente	Documentary
2012	Supremo mandamiento	Peru	Mujer	Juan Camborda	Short film
2013	Sigo siendo (Kachkaniraqmi)	Peru	Herself	Javier Corcuera	Documentary
2014	Les Hommes d'Argile	Belgium	Khadija	Mourad Boucif	
2014	Mochica	Peru	Siri's voice	Luigi Esparza y Mauricio Esparza	Animation
2015	Blas	Chile	Gabriela Blas	Felipe Carmona	
2015	Magallanes	Peru	Celina	Salvador del Solar Labarthe	
2016	Extirpador de idolatrías	Peru	Mother of the boy	Manuel Siles	
2016	El viaje macho	Peru		Luis Basurto	
2017	Retablo	Peru	Anatolia	Alvaro Delgado-Aparicio	
2018	La Matriarca	Colombia	Dionisia	Julián Casanova Ramírez	
2019	Lina from Lima	Chile Peru Argentina	Lina	María Paz González	
2019	Vivir Ilesos	Peru Argentina	Lucía	Manuel Siles	
2020	The Saint of the Impossible	Switzerland	Raffaella	Marc Raymond Wilkins	
2023	The Four Altars	Peru	Lucia	Alonso del Río	
2024	Mistura	Peru	Andean cook to Norma (lead)	Ricardo de Montreuil	

== Discography ==
Solier has performed several concerts in indigenous languages, including Quechua, Aymara, Ashaninka, and Muchik.

- Warmi (2009), the term "warmi", means "woman" in Quechua.
- Cocoa Quintucha (2015)
