= Aloft (film) =

2014 film

- Theatrical release poster
- Directed by: Claudia Llosa
- Written by: Claudia Llosa
- Produced by: Ibon Cormenzana; Phyllis Laing; José María Morales
- Starring: Jennifer Connelly; Cillian Murphy; Mélanie Laurent; William Shimell; Peter McRobbie; Ian Tracey; Andy Murray
- Cinematography: Nicolas Bolduc
- Edited by: Guillermo de la Cal
- Music by: Michael Brook
- Production companies: Wanda Visión S.A. Arcadia Motion Pictures; Buffalo Gal Pictures; Noodles Production
- Distributed by: Sony Pictures Classics
- Release dates: 12 February 2014 (Berlin); 28 March 2014 (Spain)
- Running time: 116 minutes (Berlin Film Festival version); 98 minutes (theatrical version)
- Countries: Spain; Canada; France
- Languages: English; French
- Box office: $270,971

Aloft (Spanish: No Llores Vuela) is a 2014 internationally co-produced drama film written and directed by Claudia Llosa, and starring Jennifer Connelly, Cillian Murphy and Mélanie Laurent. The film premiered in competition at the 64th Berlin International Film Festival.

== Plot ==
Nana Kunning, a struggling mother of two young sons, takes her children to an isolated location. She, along with other parents and children, have come there in order to be seen by the Architect, a faith healer who builds small delicate structures out of branches and then brings patients inside them. The Architect works by lottery and Nana's son Gully, who has an inoperable brain tumour, is not chosen to be saved. Before the Architect can touch the winning patient, a blind boy, the falcon of Ivan (Nana's other son) destroys the structure. The furious crowd refuses to give Nana and her sons a ride unless they abandon the bird. When Ivan releases the falcon, one of the men shoots it dead.

The Architect arrives at Nana's job at a hog farm, informing her that she healed the blind boy she touched, stating that he never touched the boy's eyes, while she did. Nana ignores him, but is later surprised when the man who shot the falcon comes to her, pleading that she save his child.

The Architect trains Nana in creating the structures needed to heal people. To fix the legs of a little girl, Nana builds a swing. Her sons wait in the vehicle while she heals the girl, but Ivan grows bored and goes into the woods, where he sees his mother on the swing with the girl. Not understanding what he had witnessed, Ivan takes the vehicle and attempts to drive Gully home. He instead crashes the car onto an ice-covered lake. Ivan survives, but Gully drowns under the ice. Nana is crushed by Gully's death, abandoning 10-year-old Ivan to concentrate on her faith healing.

Now 31-year-old Ivan is visited by journalist Jania Ressemore, for an interview about the falcons he breeds. When Jania asks him if he is still in contact with his mother, Ivan cuts the interview short. When Ivan learns that Jania intends to interview his mother, he decides to join her, leaving behind his own wife and child, and bringing one of his falcons.

Jania and Ivan travel to Nunavut where they find that the road has been blocked by a truck accident. They continue on foot, across a large frozen lake. In the dark, Ivan begins to hear the ice cracking. Jania takes his hand, convincing him to walk step by step. They are picked up by a local man who takes them to his home and lends them his truck.

On the road Ivan and Jania grow close. Eventually Ivan realizes that Jania is ill, and that she is making the trip so that Nana could heal her. The two fight, but when Jania tries to leave and see Nana, Ivan sends his falcon out to her. She stops the vehicle and waits for him to join her.

When they arrive at Nana's isolated retreat, Nana does not recognize Ivan, thinking he is also a journalist until, during the interview, he asks how a mother can abandon her son. Ivan vents his pain and anger. Nana consoles him, telling him that it had been too much to bear. She puts something in his hand, saying it is for Jania.

While the people hoping to be healed by Nana unwrap the stones they have been given, to see who has won the lottery to be healed, Nana tells a story of a man who fell under ice. While Nana is telling the story, Jania unwraps her lottery stone and sees it is green, which means she has not won. However, Ivan slips a white stone into her hands – which Nana had given him – and Jania begins to cry with relief.

== Cast ==
- Jennifer Connelly as Nana Kunning
- Cillian Murphy as Ivan (31)
- Mélanie Laurent as Jania Ressmore
- William Shimell as Architect Newman
- Peter McRobbie as Ike
- Andy Murray as Lance (Large Truck Owner)
- Ian Tracey as Hans
- Oona Chaplin as Alice (30)
- Winta McGrath as Gully
- Zen McGrath as Ivan (10)

== Production ==
Filming took place in Manitoba, Canada, and Madrid, Spain.

== Reception and box office ==
On review aggregator Rotten Tomatoes, the film holds an approval rating of 17% based on 65 reviews, with an average rating of 4.21/10. The website's critics consensus reads: "Glacially paced and ineptly plotted, Aloft crushes the game efforts of a talented cast under a dreary viewing experience whose title proves sadly ironic." On Metacritic, the film has a weighted average score of 34 out of 100, based on 20 critics, indicating "generally unfavorable reviews".

Critical reception in Spain, however, was more positive, with El País calling it "hypnotic and exciting", while also receiving good notices from film magazines Fotogramas and Cinemanía.

In the United States, the film had a limited release starting in May 2015. It took in receipts of $53,086 during its run. In Spain it was seen by more than 50,000 people during its theatrical run, grossing a total of €262,355.
