= Marc Wilkins =

Marc Wilkins may refer to:

- Marc Wilkins (baseball) (born 1970), former Major League Baseball pitcher
- Marc Wilkins (geneticist), geneticist credited with the concept of the proteome
- Marc Raymond Wilkins, Swiss-British film director and screenwriter

== See also ==
- Mark Wilkins (disambiguation)
