= Queen of the Desert =

Queen of the Desert may refer to:

- Queen of the Desert (film), biographical drama film about Gertrude Bell by Werner Herzog
- The Adventures of Priscilla, Queen of the Desert, a 1994 Australian film by Stephan Elliott
- Priscilla, Queen of the Desert (musical), a musical adapted from the 1994 film of same name by Stephan Elliott and Allan Scott
