= Extirpator of Idolatries =

- Official poster
- Directed by: Manuel Siles
- Screenplay by: Manuel Siles
- Produced by: Abraham Siles
- Starring: Oswaldo Salas; Magaly Solier; Augusto Casafranca; Paulina Bazán; Diego Yupanqui
- Cinematography: Marco Alvarado
- Edited by: Jean Alcócer
- Music by: Diego Eslava
- Production company: La Luna Pintada Producciones
- Release dates: 21 March 2014 (Guadalajara International Film Festival); 14 April 2016 (Peru)
- Running time: 86 minutes
- Country: Peru
- Languages: Spanish; Quechua

Extirpator of Idolatries (Spanish: Extirpador de idolatrías) is a 2014 Peruvian thriller drama film written and directed by Manuel Siles, completed in 2014 and released commercially in Peru in 2016.

== Plot ==
The police detective Waldo, of circumspect disposition and temper, investigates several crimes associated with indigenous rituals that occur in some regions of the Peruvian Andes. There a boy and a girl who are about to enter puberty begin to interact with certain mythical beings, a supernatural belief very common in many Andean villages. A sinister character (the “Extirpator of Idolatries”), pretending to be on a mission of faith, but imbued with religious dogmatism and intolerance, interrupts this peaceful scene as he casts an ominous shadow over these ancient Peruvian beliefs. Although Waldo’s boss considers him inferior and distrusts his methods, the policeman continues his efforts to capture the “Extirpator of Idolatries”. At the same time, Waldo will resolve his own inner conflict which has troubled him all his life.

== Cast ==
- Oswaldo Salas as police detective Waldo Mamani / Mythical creature
- Magaly Solier as mother of the boy
- Augusto Casafranca as extirpator of idolatries / Mythical creature
- Paulina Bazán as the girl
- Diego Yupanqui as the boy
- Renato Gianoli as chief police
- Oscar Ludeña as police deputy / Mythical creature
- Fiorella Flores as TV journalist
- Amiel Cayo as shaman / Mythical creature
- Julián Vargas as innkeeper
- Firelei Barreda as widow
- Ana Arce as mother of the girl / Mythical creature
- Diana Castro as victim

== Reception ==
=== Critical response ===
Extirpador of idolatries had a positive reception from audiences and critics at international film festivals, winning thirty two awards, and obtaining nine nominations. Peruvian critics praised the film after its premiere in Lima, film critic Sebastián Pimentel of the newspaper El Comercio calls it "a new title among the best of Peruvian cinema in recent years." He praises the work of the leading actor ("great Oswaldo Salas") and the director ("Siles has assimilated well a modern film tradition that goes beyond Europe - come to mind 'Antonio das Mortes' of the Brazilian Glauber Rocha, even the most contemporary films by Claudia Llosa, through the cinema of the Thai director Apichatpong Weerasethakul - As in the cases cited, far from verbalizing facts, Siles explores affections, beliefs, imaginaries, the latter taking the form of dreams or hallucinations that challenge the realism of what we see "). He considers it one of the 20 best commercial premieres in Peru in 2016, being one of only three Peruvian films included in the list. In the newspaper La República, the film critic Federico de Cárdenas qualifies it with 4 stars out of 5, describing it as "valuable opera prima", praises photography ("remarkable photography and camera of Marco Antonio Alvarado") and Magaly Solier's performance. Film critic Ricardo Bedoya considers it "one of the most suggestive Peruvian films of recent times".

== Awards ==
Year	Recipient	Award	Category	Result
2014	Manuel Siles	Encuentro Mundial de Cine, Denver, USA	Best Director	Won
2014	Oswaldo Salas	Encuentro Mundial de Cine, Denver, USA	Best Actor	Won
2014	Extirpator of Idolatries	Encuentro Mundial de Cine, Denver, USA	Best Feature Film	Nominated
2014	Manuel Siles	Monteria International Film Festival, Colombia	Best Screenplay	Won
2014	Extirpator of Idolatries	Lima Independiente International Film Festival, Peru	Audience Award	Won
2014	Extirpator of Idolatries	London Latin American Film Festival, UK	Audience Award	Nominated
2014	Oswaldo Salas	CinemAvvenire Film Festival, Rome, Italy	Best Actor	Won
2015	Extirpator of Idolatries	Pasto International Film Festival, Colombia	Best Feature Film	Won
2015	Extirpator of Idolatries	National Project Competition International Film Promotion, Ministry of Culture of Peru		Won
2016	Extirpator of Idolatries	Latino Awards, Marbella, Spain	Best Peruvian Feature Film	Won
2016	Manuel Siles	Latino Awards, Marbella, Spain	Best Director in Peruvian Film	Won
2016	Manuel Siles	Latino Awards, Marbella, Spain	Best Screenplay in Peruvian Film	Won
2016	Diego Eslava	Latino Awards, Marbella, Spain	Best Original Peruvian Music	Won
2016	Extirpator of Idolatries	Latino Awards, Marbella, Spain	Best Peruvian Social Feature Film	Won
2016	Extirpator of Idolatries	Luces Awards, Lima, Peru	Best Feature Film	Nominated
2016	Oswaldo Salas	Luces Awards, Lima, Peru	Best Actor	Nominated
2016	Magaly Solier	Luces Awards, Lima, Peru	Best Actress	Nominated
2016	Extirpator of Idolatries	El Comercio newspaper, Peru	The Best 20 Feature Films Released in Peru in 2016	Won
2016	Extirpator of Idolatries	La República newspaper, Peru	Best Feature Films of 2016 in Peru	Won
2017	Extirpator of Idolatries	12 Months Film Festival, Cluj-Napoca, Romania	Best Feature Film of the Month (3rd Place)	Finalist
2017	Extirpator of Idolatries	Los Angeles San Rafael Film Festival, Los Angeles de San Rafael, Segovia, Spain	Best Feature Film	Finalist
2017	Extirpator of Idolatries	Los Angeles Cinefest, Los Angeles, California, USA	Best Feature Film	Semifinalist
2017	Extirpator of Idolatries	FROSTBITE International Film Festival, Colorado Springs, Colorado, USA	Best Feature Film	Won
2017	Extirpator of Idolatries	Latino Film Market, New York City, New York, USA	Best International Latino Feature Film	Won
2018	Extirpator of Idolatries	Mosaic Film Festival, Clarkston, Georgia, USA	Best Feature Fiction	Won
2018	Extirpator of Idolatries	AltFF Alternative Film Festival, Toronto, Ontario, Canada	Best Drama, Feature Category	Nominated
2020	Manuel Siles	Prague International Monthly Film Festival (PIMFF), Czech Republic	Best Original Screenplay	Won
2020	Manuel Siles	Prague International Monthly Film Festival (PIMFF), Czech Republic	Best First-Time Director (Feature) (2nd Place)	Won
2020	Extirpator of Idolatries	Prague International Monthly Film Festival (PIMFF), Czech Republic	Best Feature Film (3rd Place)	Won
2020	Oswaldo Salas	Prague International Monthly Film Festival (PIMFF), Czech Republic	Best Actor Feature Film	Finalist
2020	Marco Alvarado	Prague International Monthly Film Festival (PIMFF), Czech Republic	Best Cinematography	Finalist
2020	Extirpator of Idolatries	Prague International Monthly Film Festival (PIMFF), Czech Republic	Best Trailer	Finalist
2020	Extirpator of Idolatries	Madras Independent Film Festival, Chennai, India	Honorable Mention	Won
2020	Extirpator of Idolatries	Eurasia International Monthly Film Festival, Moscow, Russia	Best Feature Film	Semifinalist
2020	Extirpator of Idolatries	Bridge Fest, Vancouver, Canada	Best Overall Monthly Winner (Feature Film)	Won
2020	Extirpator of Idolatries	New Cinema – Lisbon Monthly Film Festival, Portugal	Honorable Mention	Won
2020	Extirpator of Idolatries	Lonely Wolf: London International Film Festival, UK	Best Film – Action/Sci-Fi/Fantasy	Nominated
2020	Extirpator of Idolatries	Lonely Wolf: London International Film Festival, UK	Best Film – Horror	Nominated
2020	Renato Gianoli	Lonely Wolf: London International Film Festival, UK	Best Supporting Actor Feature Film	Nominated
2020	Oswaldo Salas	Košice International Monthly Film Festival, Slovakia	Best Actor Feature Film	Won
2020	Extirpator of Idolatries	Košice International Monthly Film Festival, Slovakia	Best Feature Film	Finalist

== Trivia ==
- Shot with a Canon EOS 5D Mark II camera
- For the filming of the children's scene with the mythical beings, a large number of actors and extras were needed. As a matter of budget, the actors of the film, Oswaldo Salas, Augusto Casafranca, Oscar Ludeña, Amiel Cayo and Ana Arce supported the filming personifying a group of mythical beings. The actress Katerina D'Onofrio also participated as a cameo role. Karina Chocos, mother in the real life of Paulina Bazán, also acted as a mythical being.
