= Thaller =

Thaller is a surname. Notable people with the surname include:

- Barbara Thaller (1954–2014), Austrian politician
- Michelle Thaller, American astronomer
- Nicolás Thaller (born 1998), Argentine footballer
- Tara Thaller (born 1998), Croatian actress
- Irene Thaller von Draga (1872–1932), Austrian soprano singer better known as Irene Abendroth
