= Mark Wilkins =

Mark Wilkins may refer to:

- Mark Wilkins (racing driver) (born 1983), professional sports car racing driver in the Grand-Am Rolex Sports Car Series
- Mark Wilkins, a character in the video game Resident Evil Outbreak

== See also ==
- Marc Wilkins (disambiguation)
