= Prisoners of the Ghostland =

2021 film directed by Sion Sono

- Theatrical release poster
- Directed by: Sion Sono
- Written by: Aaron Hendry; Reza Sixo Safai
- Produced by: Laura Rister; Michael Mendelsohn; Ko Mori; Reza Sixo Safai; Nate Bolotin
- Starring: Nicolas Cage; Sofia Boutella; Bill Moseley; Nick Cassavetes
- Cinematography: Sôhei Tanikawa
- Edited by: Taylor Levy
- Music by: Joseph Trapanese
- Production companies: Patriot Pictures; Untitled Entertainment; Union Patriot Capital Management; Boss Boss Bang Bang; Eleven Arts; Saturn Films; XYZ Films
- Distributed by: Elysian Film Group; RLJE Films
- Release dates: January 31, 2021 (Sundance); September 17, 2021 (United States)
- Running time: 103 minutes
- Countries: United States; Japan
- Languages: English; Japanese
- Box office: $80,425

Prisoners of the Ghostland is a 2021 American-Japanese arthouse dystopian acid Western film with the elements of horror and chanbara, directed by Sion Sono, from a script by Aaron Hendry and Reza Sixo Safai. It stars Nicolas Cage, Sofia Boutella, Bill Moseley and Nick Cassavetes. Its plot revolves around a notorious criminal, Hero (Cage), who is sent to rescue the governor's adopted granddaughter, who has disappeared into a dark region called Ghostland.

The film had its world premiere at the 2021 Sundance Film Festival on January 31, 2021. The film was released in theaters and on video on demand on September 17, 2021, by RLJE Films. Critics gave the film generally mixed reviews.

== Plot ==
In a region of Japan devastated and quarantined years ago following an accident in which highly volatile nuclear waste was spilled after a crash between the waste transport and a prison bus, a settlement called Samurai Town is ruled by an unscrupulous Governor who has blended elements of Japanese society (both modern-day and pre-modern) and the old American West together at his whim, and is keeping a harem of adopted "granddaughters" as his sex slaves. The outside is a wasteland known as the Ghostland, inhabited by half-crazed outcasts and victims of the irradiated environment. Just before the catastrophe, Hero, a criminal, was imprisoned in the aftermath of a botched bank robbery where his partner Psycho brutally murdered several innocent bystanders. It is later revealed that Psycho was in the prison transport which collided with the waste truck and thus set off the disaster.

One night, Bernice, one of the "granddaughters", flees from the Governor's house with her friends Stella and Nanci, only to get stranded in the Ghostland. The Governor has Hero released to retrieve Bernice from the Ghostland, and outfits him with a bodysuit which is set to detonate explosive charges in case he mistreats Bernice in any way, the suit itself is tampered with, or Bernice has not been rescued within five days. When departing, Hero undertakes a parting gesture of defiance against the Governor which impresses Yasujiro, the Governor's samurai bodyguard whose sister is one of the Governor's "granddaughters".

Upon entering the Ghostland, Hero is intercepted by a band of mutated men, suffers an accident, and is taken by the outcasts to their cult-like enclave and their leader, Enoch. He finds Bernice among them, but she is half-catatonic from trauma. As he prepares to transport her back, Hero accidentally triggers one of his suit's explosives, which destroys one of his testicles and renders him unconscious. In a nightmare flashback, Hero recognizes Bernice as a young girl whose mother was killed while he tried to escape the police after the bank robbery and who was subsequently taken in by the Governor. Attacked by the mutants from earlier, Hero is rendered unconscious when an explosive on his arm is set off, just before the assailants vanish. However, the detonation shakes Bernice from her catatonia.

Meanwhile, Stella returns from the Ghostland and is captured by the Governor's men, who has Yasujiro execute her, which finally turns him against the Governor. Having had a revelation during his unconsciousness about his accidental role in the cataclysm, Hero stirs the Ghostlanders into a revolt against the Governor, aided by Psycho and the mutants, his fellow convicts from the fateful accident. Hero and Bernice return to Samurai Town, but when the Governor refuses to unlock the suit and Hero pretends to take Bernice hostage, Bernice's friend Susie, traumatized from the Governor's treatment of her, massacres several of his bodyguards with a minigun. Hero, Bernice, and Yasujiro overcome the remainder, then Hero faces off against and kills Yasujiro while Bernice shoots the Governor. With the oppressor dead and the outcasts liberated, Hero, Bernice, and Susie watch as Samurai Town begins to stir with new, freer life.

== Cast ==
- Nicolas Cage as Hero
- Sofia Boutella as Bernice
- Bill Moseley as Governor
- Nick Cassavetes as Psycho
- Tak Sakaguchi as Yasujiro
- Yuzuka Nakaya as Susie
- Young Dais as Ratman
- Koto Lorena as Stella
- Canon Nawata as Nancy
- Jai West as Jay
- Charles Glover as Enoch
- Cici Zhou as Chimera
- Louis Kurihara as Curi
- Tetsu Watanabe as Nabe
- Takato Yonemoto as Sheriff Takato
- Shin Shimizu as Deputy Shin
- Matthew Chozick as Sheriff Matthew
- Constant Voisin as Constant

== Production ==
=== Development ===
In December 2018, it was announced that Sion Sono was working on his first overseas production and English-language debut, Prisoners of the Ghostland, starring Nicolas Cage. Cage said the film "might be the wildest movie I've ever made".

In February 2019, shortly after Imogen Poots was cast in a starring role, Sono underwent emergency surgery following a heart attack, halting pre-production on the film.

In November 2019, Sofia Boutella, Ed Skrein, Bill Moseley, Young Dais, and Tak Sakaguchi joined the cast, in undisclosed roles, from a script by Aaron Hendry and Reza Sixo Safai. Safai, Laura Rister, Michael Mendelsohn, Ko Mori, and Nate Bolotin signed on as producers.

=== Filming ===
Principal photography began on November 6, 2019, in Japan, with Sôhei Tanikawa serving as cinematographer. Filming also took place on March 31, 2020, in Los Angeles, California.

== Release ==
The film had its world premiere at the 2021 Sundance Film Festival on January 31, 2021. RLJE Films acquired distribution rights to the film at Sundance and released it in theaters and on video on demand on September 17, 2021.

=== Box office ===
As of January 4, 2023, Prisoners of the Ghostland had grossed US$80,425 in several international markets.

=== Critical response ===
On Rotten Tomatoes, the film has an approval rating of 61% based on reviews from 160 critics, with an average rating of 5.80/10. The website's critics' consensus reads, "Prisoners of the Ghostland is far from Sono's most distinctive work, but viewers in the mood for a deliriously gonzo genre mash-up featuring an explosive performance from Nicolas Cage just might have a ball."

On Metacritic, the film has a weighted average score of 53 out of 100 based on reviews from 33 critics, indicating "mixed or average reviews".

Nick Allen at RogerEbert.com gave the film two out of four stars: "No movie with Nicolas Cage, directed by the wonderfully weird Japanese director Sion Sono, should be this taxing, drawn out, and plainly boring."

Screen Daily commented positively on Sion Sono's film, writing, "The film is held captive by its myriad influences, but Cage is so high-spirited that you won't mind being its prisoner."

Variety wrote a mixed to positive review: "Somehow, it doesn't actually seem surprising that Cage would partner with Sono."

HorrorBuzz awarded the film a rating of six out of ten stars.

Clarisse Loughrey from Independent awarded a rating of four out of five stars: "Sono may indulge in madness, but it's not madness without reason."
