= Bon Voyage (2016 film) =

2016 film directed by Marc Raymond Wilkins

- Directed by: Marc Raymond Wilkins
- Written by: Marc Raymond Wilkins
- Produced by: Joël Louis Jent
- Starring: Jay Abdo; Stefan Gubser; Amed Ali; Annelore Sarbach; Suhair Omran
- Cinematography: Burak Turan
- Edited by: Jann Anderegg
- Music by: Balz Bachmann
- Production company: Dschoint Ventschr Filmproduction
- Release date: June 2016 (USA)
- Running time: 21 minutes
- Countries: Switzerland; Turkey
- Languages: German; English; Arabic

Bon Voyage is a Swiss-German short film written and directed by Marc Raymond Wilkins.

Bon Voyage was shortlisted with ten other short-film from 137 entries submitted to the 89th Academy Awards in Academy Award for Best Live Action Short Film category. The final five nominations are scheduled to be announced on January 24, 2016.

== Plot ==
Jonas and Silvia are enjoying a wonderful sailing holiday in the Mediterranean sea. But while sailing through the night far away from land, they discover an overloaded refugee boat which is close to sinking. They are shocked but too afraid to help. They call the coast guards but lose the boat out of sight into the darkness of the night. In the early morning, they find themselves drifting through an ocean of dead bodies. The refugee boat has sunk. Jonas and Silvia manage to pull a few Syrian survivors out of the cold water. This rescue marks the beginning of a dramatic conflict between the hopes and dreams of the refugees, and the fears and ideals of the holiday sailors.

== Cast ==
- Jay Abdo as Kareem
- Stefan Gubser as Jonas
- Amed Ali as Thabit
- Annelore Sarbach as Silvia
- Suhair Omran as Maha

== Awards and nominations ==
Award	Category	Recipients	Result
Palm Springs International Festival of Short Films	Best Live Action Short over 15 minutes	Marc Raymond Wilkins and Dschoint Ventschr Filmproduktion AG	Won
San Diego Film Festival	Best Short Film	Marc Raymond Wilkins	Won
San Diego Film Festival	Best Narrative Short	Marc Raymond Wilkins, Joël Louis Jent, Jay Abdo and Dschoint Ventschr Filmproduktion AG	Won
89th Academy Awards	Academy Award for Best Live Action Short Film	Marc Raymond Wilkins; Joël Louis Jent	Short-listed
