= 1st Born =

- Film poster
- Directed by: Ali Atshani
- Written by: Sam Khoze; Tarek Zohdy; Mehdi Alimirzaee
- Story by: Ali Atshani
- Produced by: Ali Atshani; Edwin Avaness; Sam Khoze; Jack Sheehan
- Starring: Taylor Cole; Reza Sixo Safai; Jay Abdo; Tom Berenger; Val Kilmer; Denise Richards
- Cinematography: Naeem Seirafi
- Edited by: Sam Khoze; Phil Norden
- Music by: Ramin Kousha
- Distributed by: Uncork'd Entertainment
- Release date: December 3, 2019
- Running time: 79 minutes
- Countries: United States; Iran
- Language: English

1st Born is a 2019 comedy film directed by Ali Atshani and starring Taylor Cole, Reza Sixo Safai, Jay Abdo, Tom Berenger, Val Kilmer, and Denise Richards. It is the first time Iran and the United States have collaborated on a film.

== Cast ==
- Taylor Cole as Kate
- Reza Sixo Safai as Ben
- Jay Abdo as Hamid
- Tom Berenger as Tucker Jefferson
- Val Kilmer as Biden
- Robert Knepper as Joe
- Denise Richards as Christine
- Dominique Swain as Ingrid
- William Baldwin as Saul

== Reception ==
Renee Schonfeld of Common Sense Media awarded the film one star out of five.
