= The Milk of Sorrow =

2009 Peruvian film by Claudia Llosa

- Spanish: La teta asustada
- Directed by: Claudia Llosa
- Written by: Claudia Llosa
- Produced by: Antonio Chavarrías; Claudia Llosa; José María Morales
- Starring: Magaly Solier; Susi Sánchez; Efrain Solís
- Cinematography: Natasha Braier
- Edited by: Frank Gutiérrez
- Music by: Selma Mutal
- Release dates: February 12, 2009 (Berlinale); February 13, 2009 (Spain); March 12, 2009 (Peru)
- Running time: 95 minutes
- Countries: Peru; Spain
- Languages: Spanish; Quechua
- Box office: $1.5 million

The Milk of Sorrow (Spanish: La teta asustada, lit. 'The scared tit') is a 2009 Peruvian-Spanish drama film directed, written and co-produced by Claudia Llosa. The film stars Magaly Solier and addresses the fears of abused women during Peru's recent history.

It won the Golden Bear award and FIPRESCI prize at the 2009 Berlin International Film Festival, as well as the award for best film in the 24 Festival Internacional de Cine de Guadalajara in Mexico. It was nominated for the 82nd Academy Awards for Best Foreign Language Film, becoming the first Peruvian film to be nominated for the award.

== Plot ==
An elderly woman sings a song as she lies dying in her bed. She describes her own rape and the death of her husband. At the end of the song, she slowly passes away while lying next to her daughter, Fausta (Magaly Solier).

Fausta has grown up on stories of the horrors that occurred during the internal conflict in Peru between Sendero Luminoso, a guerrilla group, and the Peruvian government. This has left Fausta with a crippling fear of men and rape. To dissuade any attempts of rape, she has placed a potato in her vagina. Throughout the film, this potato begins to impact her health yet she continues to refuse to allow the doctors to remove it.

In the aftermath of her mother's death, Fausta and her family do not have enough money to take her mother's body back to their village for burial. Fausta takes work in the home of a wealthy pianist, Aída (Susi Sánchez), who is struggling to complete a new piece in time for an upcoming recital.

When the pianist discovers that Fausta has a knack for writing her own songs, Aída encourages her to complete a song for her by offering a string of pearls in exchange. Fausta desperately needs this money in order to pay for her mother's funeral and agrees.

The night of the recital, Aída performs Fausta's song to a roaring applause. On the way back to Aída's home after the recital, Fausta comments about the positive reception that the song received. Aída is afraid Fausta will say something that will let the driver know Aída is not the composer and responds by kicking Fausta out into the dark streets of Lima by herself.

The night after her cousin's wedding, Fausta's uncle comes into her room and frightens her while she sleeps. He begs her to live her life and not waste her days in a state of never-ending fear like her mother did.

At the end of the film, Fausta decides to go through with the operation to get the potato removed and buries her mother near the ocean. It is implied that Fausta will move on with her life, leaving her fears behind her.

== Background ==
Between 1980 and 1992 Peru experienced a period of extreme violence, particularly in the Andean region, because of the uprising of the Sendero Luminoso (Shining Path) and the actions of the paramilitary and state armed forces. By 1990 the conflict had reached Lima, the capital city of Peru. Claudia Llosa refers in her film to the folk belief that the trauma experienced by women who were raped by members of security force was passed on to their children through their breast milk. Thus, this period of violence continues to affect not only those who experienced it but also the next generation.

Llosa's work is a psychological as well as sociological approach to the 12 years of conflict, and exposes the mass rapes used by the army as a strategy of war. The film is based on the book Entre Prójimos, by Kimberly Theidon. In her book, Theidon documents a number of testimonials by women who were raped by as many as thirty men at a time, atrocities that often resulted in pregnancies. Theidon states that "when survivors of sexual violence speak about their experiences, they place a responsibility on their listeners to respond to what they have heard." Llosa's film, too, is an attempt to respond to such testimonies.

== Filming ==
Most of the filming locations are in Manchay, an impoverished suburban area in Pachacamac, southeast of Lima, which indigenous people took over during the 1980s to escape from terrorism, and near a high-class area of Lima called Cieneguilla.

== Critical reception ==
The film received positive reviews, having a 78% rating on Rotten Tomatoes, based on 41 reviews, and an average rating of 6.79/10, and a critical consensus:"Claudia Llosa's deliberate pace and abstract storytelling may frustrate some viewers, but there's no denying the visual pleasures soaking in The Milk of Sorrow". Metacritic assigned a weighted average score of 68 out of 100, based on 10 critics.

Peter Brunette, from The Hollywood Reporter, said "The film is gorgeously shot and contains a plethora of haunting images". Boyd van Hoeij from Variety said that "Peruvian realities and Llosa's light magical realism mesh to create a vivid picture of a society and its problems."

While some Peruvian critics gave the film negative reviews, the plot and the performances were praised by American and European critics.

== Awards ==
=== Film awards ===
| Year | Category | Person Nominated | Best Movie Nominated (Results) |
|---|---|---|---|
| 59th Berlin International Film Festival | Golden Bear | Claudia Llosa | Won |
| 59th Berlin International Film Festival | FIPRESCI | Claudia Llosa | Won |
| 2009 Guadalajara International Film Festival | Best Movie | Claudia Llosa | Won |
| 2009 Guadalajara International Film Festival | Best Actress | Magaly Solier | Won |
| 2009 Montreal World Film Festival | Best Actress | Magaly Solier | Won |
| 2009 Association Québécoises des Critiques de Cinéma | Best Movie | Claudia Llosa | Won |
| 2009 Lima Film Festival | Best Peruvian Movie | Claudia Llosa | Won |
| 2009 Lima Film Festival | CONACINE Award | Claudia Llosa | Won |
| 2009 Lima Film Festival | Best Actress | Magaly Solier | Won |
| 2009 Havana Film Festival | Best Movie | Claudia Llosa | Won |
| 2009 Bogota Film Festival | Best Movie | Claudia Llosa | Won |
| 2009 Peruvian Association of Cinematographic Press | Best Peruvian Movie | Claudia Llosa | Won |
| 2010 Goya Awards | Best Spanish Language Foreign Film | Claudia Llosa | Nominated |
| 82nd Academy Awards | Best Foreign Language Film | Claudia Llosa | Nominated |
| 2010 Ariel Award | Best Ibero-American Film | Claudia Llosa | Nominated |

== See also ==
- List of Peruvian submissions for the Academy Award for Best International Feature Film
