= Jay Abdo =

Syrian actor

- جهاد عبدو
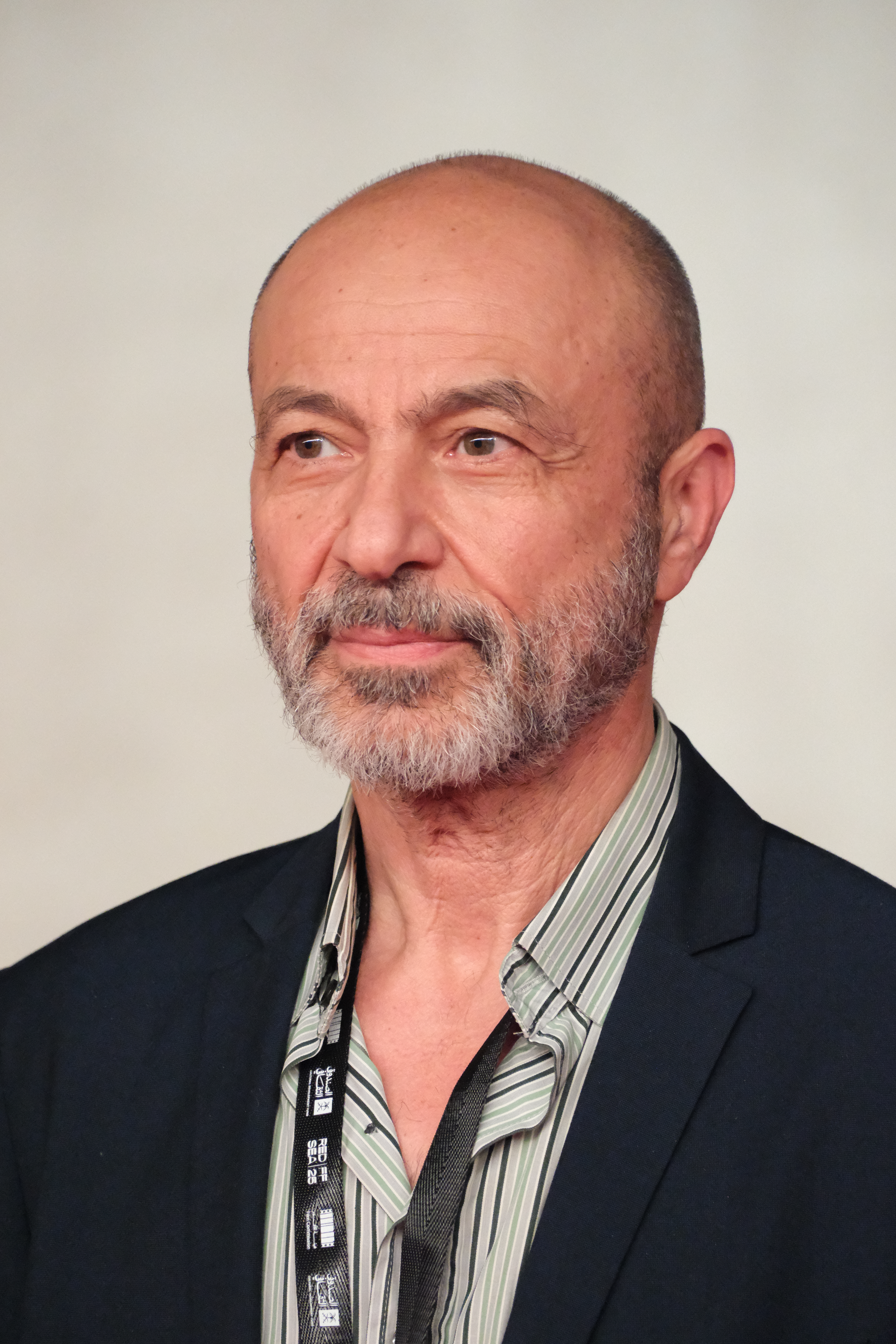
- Jay Abdo 2025
- Born: Jihad Abdo; October 21, 1962 (age 63); Damascus, Syria
- Education: Higher Institute of Dramatic Arts
- Occupation: Actor
- Years active: 1986–present
- Spouse: Rebab Kanaan (m. 1998; div. 2001) Fadia Afashe (m. 2006)
- Children: 1

Jay Abdo (Arabic: جهاد عبدو; born Jihad Abdo or Jihad Abdou; October 21, 1962) is a Syrian actor. He has been acting since 1988, and most recently starred in Queen of the Desert and A Hologram for the King.

== Early life ==
Abdo was born in Damascus. He traveled to Cluj-Napoca, Romania, to study civil engineering and began acting there. After his success on the stage, he returned to Damascus to study acting at the Higher Institute of Dramatic Arts. After graduating in 1991, he became well known in the Arab world and starred in many films and television shows.

== Move to America ==
In 2011, during a trip to Beirut where he spoke to a reporter from the Los Angeles Times, Abdo spoke out against the Assad government and how they were "responsible for killings within their borders". After returning to Syria, Abdo received a number of threats and was generally intimidated, and was criticized for his lack of patriotism. Following this, he moved to the United States in October 2011 to escape persecution. He joined his wife in Minnesota, where she was studying as a Humphrey fellow at the Fulbright Program. The couple later moved to Los Angeles so he could start acting again. After working several odd jobs, including delivering for Domino's Pizza, he landed several major roles, including Queen of the Desert and A Hologram for the King.

In 2015, the USC School of Cinematic Arts created a documentary about him titled “Jihad in Hollywood“.

== Filmography ==
- 2001 – Salah al-Din
- 2006 – Valley of the Wolves: Iraq – Kurdish leader (as Jihad Abdou)
- 2008 – Zahret Al Nerjis (TV Series) – Raeed
- 2008–2010 – Bab Al-Hara (TV Series) – Riyad
- 2010 – Baed Al Sokoot (TV Movie) – Najy (as Jihad Abdou)
- 2010 – Sabaya (TV Series) – Osama
- 2011 – The Adventures of Delilah and Al Zeibaq (TV Series) – Al Sukary
- 2012 – Farouk Omar – The Emporio Messenger
- 2013 – Father's Revenge (Short) – Father
- 2013 – We've Got Balls – Butler
- 2014 – Queen of the Desert
- 2014 – Documenters (Short) (completed) – Soldier
- 2015–2018 – Patriot
- 2016 – Bon Voyage
- 2016 – A Hologram for the King
- 2017 – Facing Mecca
- 2018 – 1st Born
- 2021 – Neighbours
- 2024 – Skeet – Mohamed
