= The Saint of the Impossible =

- Film Poster
- Directed by: Marc Raymond Wilkins
- Screenplay by: Lani-Rain Feltham; Marc Raymond Wilkins
- Produced by: Joël Jent
- Starring: Magaly Solier; Marcelo Durand; Adriano Durand; Tara Thaller; Simon Käser
- Cinematography: Burak Turan
- Edited by: Jann Anderegg
- Music by: Balz Bachmann
- Production company: Dschoint Ventschr Filmproduktion
- Distributed by: Bendita Film
- Release date: October 2020 (São Paulo International Film Festival)
- Running time: 97 min.
- Country: Switzerland
- Languages: English; Spanish

The Saint of the Impossible is a 2020 Swiss drama film written by Lani-Rain Feltham and Marc Raymond Wilkins, who is also the director in his directional debut. The film stars Magaly Solier, Marcelo Durand, Adriano Durand, Tara Thaller and Simon Käser.

== Cast ==
- Magaly Solier as Raffaella
- Adriano Durand Castro as Paul Andino
- Marcelo Durand Castro as Tito Andino
- Tara Thaller as Kristin
- Simon Käser as Ewald Krieg
- Bethany Kay as Receptionist
- Qurrat Ann Kadwani as ICE Officer Statham
- Brian Dole as Jake
- Carla Carvalho as Immigrant
- Pascal Yen-Pfister as coltman
- Damian Muziani as Customer with Cap
- Alan Rowe Kelly as Street journalist
- Joseph Covino as Manager
- Ratnesh Dubey as Adarsh
- Juan Szilagyi as NYPD Officer
- Craig Thomas Rivela as Reporter #1
- Jocelyne O'Toole as Mother (as Jocelyne Otoole)
- Peter Williams as Ear Wax Man
- Chris Valenti as Police Detective
- Elizabeth Covarrubias as Lucha
- Alex Xenos as Prison Guard
- Franky Tarantino as Cuban Restaurant Patron
- Ralph Bracco as Detective
- Jeffrey Paul as Man with red face
- Isabelle Boulton as Journalist #2 (as Isabelle Zufferey Boulton)
- John F. Sarno as Simon
- Philip O'Gorman as The Waiter
- Adam Keane as Restaurant Patron
- Vincent Chan as Mr. Liu
- Carlos Valentino as Latino Prison Officer
- Amanda Lea Mason as Soccer Mom
- Kaori Eda as Laundromat Attendant
- Sam Kearns as Restaurant Patron
- Maxmillian Robinson as Kissing Couple
- Michael Raymond Fox as ICE Officer
- John Palacio as John Cray
- Melanie Christine Leon-Soon as Daughter
- Lisa Grecco as Sad Woman
- Patrick Gallagher as Admirer 1
- Kiat-Sing Teo as Min
- Leonid Sukala as Tough Guy (as Leonik Sukala)
- Franky Tarantino as Hispanic Restaurant Patron
- Pam Kalski as Diner
- Merin Frazier as Diner Patron
- Lynn Farrell as Diner Patron
- Miss Sandra Mhlongo as Nomusa
- Michael Pierre-Louis as Prison Guard

== Release ==
The film had its world premiere in October 2020 at the 43rd São Paulo International Film Festival.
