= Rodencia y el diente de la princesa =

- Film poster
- Directed by: David Bisbano
- Written by: David Bisbano; Raquel Faraoni
- Produced by: Milton Guerrero; Álvaro Urtizberea
- Starring: Hernán Bravo; Natalia Rosminati; Ricardo Alanis; Enrique Porcellana; Oswaldo Salas; English Cast: Miranda Cosgrove; Drake Bell; Jon Heder; Cary Elwes; Jon Lovitz; Tom Arnold
- Edited by: David Bisbano
- Music by: Panchi Quesada
- Production companies: Red Post Studio Vista Sur Films S.r.l.
- Distributed by: United International Pictures (Peru); Distribution Company (Argentina)
- Release date: 11 October 2012 (Peru)
- Running time: 87 minutes
- Countries: Peru; Argentina
- Language: Spanish

Rodencia y el diente de la princesa (English: Rodencia and the Princess Tooth) is a 2012 Peruvian-Argentine animated adventure comedy film, directed by David Bisbano and produced by Red Post Studio (PE) and Vista Sur Films (AR).

== Plot ==
An old legend tells that in a vast and wild forest, there is the kingdom of Rodencia, a place inhabited by creatures and powerful wizards. Rodencia and the Princess's Tooth follows the adventures of little Edam, an apprentice magician, together with the little mouse Brie. They begin a journey in which they will face dangers to get the magic tooth of a princess, which will give them the power to defeat the dark forces led by the evil magician Rotex and his army of rats who threaten to invade Rodencia.

== Voice cast ==
Spanish cast

- Hernán Bravo as Edam
- Natalia Rosminati as Brie
- Ricardo Alanis as Roquefort
- Enrique Porcellana as Gruyère
- Sergio Bermejo as Rotex-Texor
- Oswaldo Salas as Blue, General Rat and Edam grandfather

Brazilian Portuguese cast

- Philippe Maia as Edam
- Erika Menezes as Brie
- Luiz Carlos Persy as Rotex-Texor

=== English cast ===
- Tom Arnold as Dalliwog the Wizard
- Drake Bell as Sebastian
- Miranda Cosgrove as Princess Samantha "Sam"
- Jon Heder as Sir Jonas
- Cary Elwes as Sir Thaddeus
- Jon Lovitz as The King of Mice
- Aracely Arambula as Kimmy
- Gregg Sulkin as The Dark Rodent
- Dallas Lovato as The Queen of Mice
- Savannah Hudson as Mozzarella
- Brandon Hudson as Provolone
