= Madeinusa =

2006 Peruvian–Spanish drama film

- Promotional release poster
- Directed by: Claudia Llosa
- Written by: Claudia Llosa
- Produced by: José María Morales; Antonio Chavarrías; Claudia Llosa
- Starring: Magaly Solier; Carlos de la Torre; Juan Ubaldo Huamán; Yiliana Chong; Melvin Quijada
- Music by: Selma Mutal
- Production companies: Wanda Visión S.A.; Oberón Cinematográfica; Vela Producciones
- Release dates: January 2006 (Sundance); 31 March 2006 (Spain); 14 September 2006 (Peru)
- Running time: 100 minutes
- Countries: Peru; Spain
- Languages: Spanish; Quechua

Madeinusa is a 2006 Peruvian-Spanish drama film written, co-produced, and directed by Claudia Llosa. It premiered at the 2006 Sundance Film Festival and was Peru's submission for Best Foreign Language Film (Note: It was filmed in Quechua and Spanish.) at the 79th Academy Awards.

== Plot ==
Set in the fictional small and isolated indigenous village of Manayaycuna ("the town no one can enter" in Quechua) in the Peruvian Andes, the story covers three days in the lives of the villagers and a stranger from Lima. The stranger, Salvador (Carlos de la Torre), is sent by a mining company to evaluate the geology of the area, but must stay in Manyaycuna over the weekend until travel can be provided. Salvador appears to be unwelcome he has arrived at the beginning of Tiempo Santo ("Holy Time"), a syncretic religious festival spanning Good Friday and Easter Sunday, and is sequestered in a barn by the town's mayor, Cayo. The villagers of Manayaycuna believe that during Holy Time, God, symbolized by an effigy of Christ, is dead and, therefore, nothing is a sin. Cayo is the father of the strangely named Madeinusa (Magaly Solier), a teenage girl who is the eponymous protagonist of the film, and has long been trying to take her virginity. However, Madeinusa has been able to hold him off, promising she will relent during Holy Time.

At the beginning of the weekend, Madeinusa is selected as the festival's Mater Dolorosa, much to her sister Chale's dismay. Madeinusa, desperate to leave the village and go to Lima, where her mother left for many years before, becomes interested in Salvador and has a conversation with him in the family's barn. During the town's night march, Madeinusa loses her virginity to Salvador. When Cayo finds out, he acts intimidatingly to Salvador, but does not physically harm him. Later, the film shows Salvador watching through a crack in the house's wall as Cayo has sex with Madeinusa. Madeinusa begs Salvador to take her with him back to Lima against the backdrop of the high sierra Andean landscape. At the end of the film, Madeinusa slips rat poison into her father's soup, poisoning him. The two sisters place the blame on Salvador and the film ends with Madeinusa sitting in what would be Salvador's spot on the truck back to Lima, suggesting he was killed or imprisoned by the villagers.

== Cast ==
- Magaly Solier as Madeinusa
- Carlos J. de la Torre as Salvador
- Yiliana Chong as Chale
- Juan Ubaldo Huamán as Cayo

== Themes ==
Madeinusa deals with themes including feminism, sexual violence, race, and colonialism, the latter two particularly between Salvador as a white resident of Lima and Madeinusa as a Quecha indigenous rural villager. The film also employs up-close shots and views of eyes and looking perhaps as a mechanism to discuss the sexual voyeurism in the film its broader themes.

== Controversy ==
DVD cover release in the US market

Madeinusa has received critical acclaim outside of Peru, but has been the subject of intense debate. Critics of the film suggest that the film enforces racist stereotypes of indigenous Peruvians as perverted and primitive, and point to the director's upbringing as a middle-class resident of Lima as arrogantly trying to appropriate the culture of those far more marginalized than she was. Supporters, who include star Magaly Solier and many of the residents of the actual town filmed, Canrey Chico, see the film as a postcolonial feminist narrative that subverts traditional expectations of the 'colonizer' and the 'colonized.'

== Awards ==
- Winner, Best Latin-American Narrative Feature, Mar del Plata Film Festival
- Winner, Best Cinematography and Best Screenplay, Cine Ceará Festival Nacional de Cinema
- Winner, Fipresci Prize, International Film Festival Rotterdam
- Winner, Best Original Screenplay, Havana International Film Festival
- Winner, Best Film at the 2nd Luces Awards

== See also ==
- List of Spanish films of 2006
