= Neighbours (2021 film) =

2021 Kurdish film directed by Mani Kalil

- Sero looking toward sky
- Directed by: Mano Khalil
- Written by: Mano Khalil
- Produced by: Mano Khalil; Ivan Madeo; Michael Weber
- Starring: Serhed Khalil; Zirek; Jenan Mustafa; Tina Marian; Jay Abbo
- Cinematography: Stéphane Kuthy
- Edited by: Maya Schmid
- Music by: Peter Scherer
- Production companies: Frame Film; Pallas Film; MP Film Production
- Distributed by: Menemsha Films
- Release date: 2021
- Running time: 124 minutes
- Country: Switzerland / France
- Languages: Kurdish, Arabic, Hebrew

Neighbours (German: Nachbarn; Kurdish: Ciran) is a 2021 film written and directed by Mano Khalil. A Swiss/French co-production, the film depicts the experiences of a Kurdish boy in a small Syrian border village during the early 1980s. It premiered at the Berlinale’s European Film Market and went on to screen at more than 200 festivals worldwide.

== Plot ==
Set in a Kurdish village on the Syrian–Turkish border, the film follows Sero, an innocent young boy. At age six he enters school for the first time, taught by a new teacher sent by the Ba’athist regime. The village school becomes an instrument of propaganda, with the children forced to speak Arabic; Kurdish language and culture are suppressed, and the children are taught to denounce Israel and praise the president. Largely told through Sero's perspective, the story reveals how "absurd nationalism" can destroy community bonds.

== Cast ==
- Serhed Khalil as Sero
- Zîrek as teacher
- Jenan Mustafa as Sero’s mother
- Tina Marian as Hanna
- Jay Abdo as Jewish neighbor

== Production ==
The film was written and directed by Kurdish-Swiss filmmaker Mano Khalil, who based the story on his own childhood experiences near the Syrian–Turkish border. It was produced by Frame Film in collaboration with Pallas Film and MP Film Production. Principal photography took place in Northern Kurdistan and Syria, with post-production completed in Switzerland. Cinematography was by Stéphane Kuthy, and editing by Maya Schmid.

== Themes ==
Neighbours explores childhood under dictatorship, the repression of Kurdish identity, and the tension between state ideology and human coexistence. Critics have noted its blend of tragedy and humor and its compassionate tone in depicting multicultural life under political pressure.

== Release ==
It was released theatrically in Switzerland and Germany in 2022 by Bernsteiner-Film, and distributed in the U.S. and Canada by Menemsha Films.

== Reception ==
The film received positive reviews from critics.

- The Jewish Film Review: "Very highly recommended”
- St. Louis Jewish Light: "One of the year's best Jewish-interest films...powerful, satiric punch in its chilling depiction of how hatred is taught”
- Film Matters Magazine: When balloons were lifting early in the film, it was a "stunning tapestry of color against a darkening sky, symbolizing the ongoing Kurdish resistance."
- Out Now: "Nothing is trivialized from the child's eyes...an oppressive and thought-provoking drama."
- Kurdistan Chronicle: "Humorous yet serious... providing light moments nestled between dark drama and dictatorship."
- Variety: "A tale with a remarkably upbeat tone"

== Awards (selected) ==
- Youth Jury Prize – Innsbruck International Film Festival (2022)
- Utopia Prize, for spreading "the magic of utopia, of ‘non-place’, along with ideas such as discovery, soul-searching, dreaming, courage, solidarity, justice and beauty;" Castellinaria Festival
- Best Script Award, Red Sea International Film Festival
- Best Film, Gangneung Film Festival
- Film Critics Jury Prize, San Francisco Jewish Film Festival, 2021
- Audience Award, Boston Jewish Film Festival 2021
- 2022 Young Jury Best Film, Hong Kong Asian Film Festival
- Bern Film Award 2021 for THE BEST MOVIE 2021

== See also ==
- Cinema of Switzerland
- Kurdish cinema
