= Certified Copy (film) =

2010 film by Abbas Kiarostami

- French theatrical release poster
- French: Copie conforme
- Directed by: Abbas Kiarostami
- Written by: Abbas Kiarostami
- Produced by: Marin Karmitz; Nathanaël Karmitz; Charles Gillibert; Angelo Barbagallo
- Starring: Juliette Binoche; William Shimell
- Cinematography: Luca Bigazzi
- Edited by: Bahman Kiarostami
- Production companies: MK2; BiBi Film; France 3 Cinéma
- Distributed by: MK2 Diffusion (France); BiM Distribuzione (Italy); Alternative Films (Belgium)
- Release dates: 18 May 2010 (Cannes); 19 May 2010 (France and Belgium); 21 May 2010 (Italy)
- Running time: 106 minutes
- Countries: France; Italy; Belgium
- Languages: English; French; Italian
- Budget: €3.8 million
- Box office: $7.7 million

Certified Copy (French: Copie conforme) is a 2010 art film written and directed by Abbas Kiarostami. Set in Tuscany, the film focuses on a British writer (William Shimell) and a French antiques dealer (Juliette Binoche), whose relationship undergoes an odd transformation over the course of a day. The film is a co-production of France, Italy and Belgium. The dialogue is in English, French and Italian.

Certified Copy premiered at the 2010 Cannes Film Festival, where Binoche won the Best Actress award for her performance. Critically acclaimed, the film is considered to be among the best of the year and the decade.

== Plot ==
British writer James Miller makes a stop in Arezzo, Tuscany, on a tour to promote his new book, Certified Copy, which argues that, in art, issues of authenticity are irrelevant because every reproduction is itself an original, and even the original is a copy of another form. A French antiques dealer, who is never named, attends the event with her 11-year-old son in order to have Miller sign several copies of the book she has purchased, but has to leave early because her son is hungry and becomes a distraction. She leaves her phone number with Miller's book's translator. Later, her son suggests that she is romantically interested in Miller, which she denies.

Miller and the woman later meet at her shop. Though she had intended for them to browse antiques together, he instead suggests that they go for a drive, as long as they are back for his 9 p.m. train. On their aimless trip, Miller signs six copies of his book for the woman, including a copy for her sister, Marie, in which he inscribes a note that the woman dislikes. The two debate the premise of his book, including the relationship between authenticity and simplicity. During the conversation, which occasionally becomes strained, Miller points out that even the Mona Lisa is a "copy" of the woman who modeled for the painting, real or imagined.

The woman takes Miller to an art museum to see another famous "copy", but he is uninterested, saying that he has already finished work on the book and is not interested in further examples. The woman becomes increasingly distraught as she complains about her rebellious son to Miller, but he attempts to rationalize her son's behavior, frustrating the woman.

At his insistence, they visit a nearby café for coffee. When Miller steps out to take a phone call, the café owner begins speaking to the woman, mistaking Miller for her husband. The antiques dealer plays along as the café owner espouses the importance of marriage, regardless of the flaws of one's partner. Miller returns and the woman tells him about the café owner's assumption of their relationship.

Once they leave the café, the nature of their discussion changes, and they begin to speak in a combination of French and English instead of just English (Miller states that he only learned French, not Italian, in school). They also begin to behave as though they are a married couple, referring to the woman's son as "our" son. She expresses unhappiness over their 15th wedding anniversary the previous night, during which he fell asleep while she was getting ready in the bathroom, and tells him his constant traveling for work has made him emotionally distant.

Walking through the city, they encounter an older couple and discuss their interpretations of a nearby statue. The older man pulls Miller aside and offers unsolicited "fatherly" advice: that a small gesture of affection could mend the rift between Miller and his wife. As Miller and his wife walk away, he places his hand on her shoulder; when they go into a restaurant, she goes to the bathroom and applies lipstick and puts on earrings.

When she returns to the table, Miller is angry, having clashed with the waiter over the quality of the wine. They begin to fight and Miller leaves the restaurant, though he waits for her outside. They soon find themselves at the hotel where Miller and his wife spent their honeymoon, though Miller does not remember the specifics of the hotel.

The woman goes inside and asks to tour the room; she and Miller reminisce about their wedding night, although Miller does not remember many details. The woman appeals to Miller, saying that they should be more accepting of each other's faults, because the alternative is loneliness. He appears to rebuff her, saying he still has to catch his 9 p.m. train. Miller then goes into the bathroom and looks into the mirror; when nearby church bells begin to toll at 8 p.m., he leaves the bathroom.

== Cast ==
- Juliette Binoche as she
- William Shimell as James Miller
- Jean-Claude Carrière as the man at the square
- Agathe Natanson as the woman at the square
- Gianna Giachetti as the café owner
- Adrian Moore as the son
- Angelo Barbagallo as the translator
- Andrea Laurenzi as the guide
- Filippo Troiano as the groom
- Manuela Balsimelli as the bride

== Production ==
Abbas Kiarostami and Juliette Binoche first met and became friends in the mid-1990s. Since then they had both desired to work together and in 2008 Binoche appeared briefly in Kiarostami's experimental film Shirin. During a visit to Tehran by Binoche, Kiarostami told Binoche the synopsis of Certified Copy as a casual anecdote, which she said that she fully believed until he confessed to having made it up. According to Kiarostami, studying the reactions of Binoche as she listened to the story was a vital part of the film's further development. "The film started to build according to the story that I was telling, but also according to my knowledge of her as a woman with her vulnerability, with her sensitivity, with what I knew about her soul, about her relationship with her children."

The film suffered from several delays and changes in the cast. Filming was originally supposed to start in October 2007 with English as the principal language. A second attempt was planned for March 2008, this time mainly in French and with Sami Frey opposite Binoche. Next up to be attached was François Cluzet, with filming scheduled to begin in May 2009. At some point Robert De Niro was in negotiation for the role, but eventually it was offered to William Shimell, a baritone opera singer who had never acted in a film before. Kiarostami had met Shimell in 2008 during his debut as an opera director, an adaptation of Così fan tutte for the Aix-en-Provence Festival, in which Shimell performed as Don Alfonso. "When I saw him, I immediately perceived in him the strength, finesse and humour of the character", Kiarostami commented on his choice.

Production was led by MK2 in co-production with France 3 Cinéma and the Italian company BiBi Film. Funding was granted by the CNC and via pre-sales to Canal+. The budget was €3.8 million.

Filming finally began on 8 June 2009 on location in Tuscany, using locations in Cortona, Lucignano and Arezzo. Kiarostami is normally known for making films with amateur actors and almost no budget, but said he had no difficulties in making the transition to European cinema: "This was the simplest film for me to work on—even more simple than the work I've done on my shorts, because I was working with a professional team both in front of and behind the camera." He also noted how he for once felt free to express whatever he wanted in the film.

== Release ==
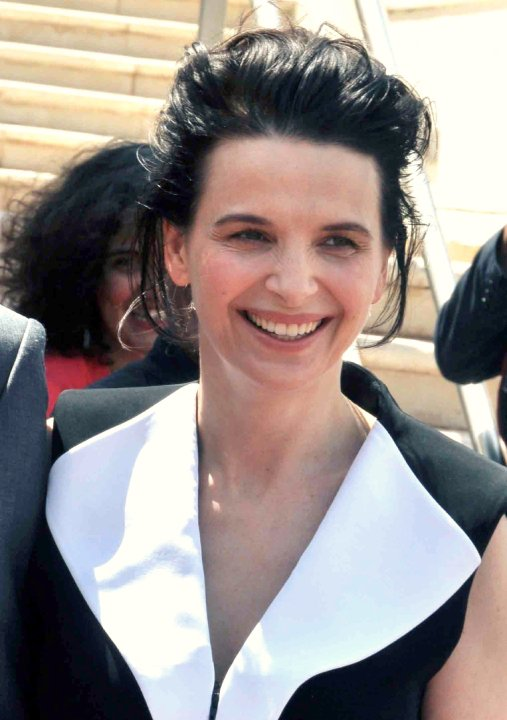
Juliette Binoche at the 2010 Cannes Film Festival for the premiere of the film

Certified Copy premiered on 18 May 2010 at the 63rd Cannes Film Festival as part of the main competition. It was released the following day in French cinemas through MK2. The film opened in 101 venues and had an attendance of 70,876 the first week, resulting in a ninth place on the French box office chart. After the theatrical run's second week, the number of screens had been increased to 147 and the film climbed one position on the chart, with a total attendance of 151,152. The French website AlloCiné reported a final total of 240,797 admissions.

Artificial Eye released the film in the United Kingdom on 3 September 2010. It grossed £77,000 from 20 screens the opening weekend and entered the British box office chart at number 20. The Guardian reported that this was significantly better than how Kiarostami's films usually perform in the United Kingdom. IFC Films acquired the rights for American distribution and Madman for Australia and New Zealand.

During the release, the film was often billed as the director's first film to be made outside his native Iran, but in reality it was only his first dramatic feature film to be shot abroad. It was preceded by the 2001 documentary ABC Africa and a segment in the 2005 anthology film Tickets. In Iran, the film was automatically banned by the Ministry of Culture and Islamic Guidance. Jamal Shourjeh from the ministry's Cinematic Department explained: "Certified Copy has been produced by a non-Iranian in Italy in western culture; therefore, it should have a license for national screening". Iran's deputy culture minister Javad Shamaqdari later said that the film would remain banned from general screening, citing Juliette Binoche's attire in the film as the main reason, but that it would be allowed to be shown "in some private circles and universities".

== Reception ==
The French reception was very positive. "Through strokes of chased dialogue and close-ups, Abbas Kiarostami achieves a universal film, between levity and drama, about the feelings that are diluted over time", wrote Renaud Baronian in Le Parisien. Baronian also liked the lead performances, finding that Shimell "impresses with his restraint" while Binoche "proves overwhelming". Nicholas Schiavi of Excessif rated the film with four stars out of five and applauded Kiarostami's craft: "With a formally refined technique and an incredible sense of frames within frames, the Iranian filmmaker offers a lesson in cinema. Each framework is a fixed organic tableau where the depth of field and the games of mirrors shape a sensory architecture. One can perceive the remains of the past and the possibilities of an idyll." Emmanuèle Frois of Le Figaro wrote: "Inspired by Roberto Rossellini, Abbas Kiarostami signs his own Journey to Italy without plagiarizing the original." Frois noted how believable she found the couple with their "desires, disappointments, misunderstandings, hopes", and how the narrative alternates between drama and comedy, "like in life."

The review aggregator website Rotten Tomatoes indicates that 89% of the film's American and British reviews were overall positive, based on 136 reviews, with an average rating of 7.8/10. The website's critics consensus reads, "The main stars are absolutely perfect in this absorbing, existential drama that dissects human relationships." On Metacritic, the film has a weighted average score of 82 out of 100, based on 23 critics, indicating "universal acclaim".

In The Hollywood Reporter, Deborah Young called Certified Copy "a delicate, bittersweet comedy". Young wrote that Binoche was given "a chance to display her noteworthy gifts as a comedienne, switching effortlessly from English to French and Italian to build a character that is resentful, manipulative and seductive all at once", and that Shimell's "elegant cool is very close to George Sanders'", referring to Sanders' role in Journey to Italy. Peter Bradshaw of The Guardian was less impressed: "It is a film that is pregnant with ideas, and for aspiring to a cinema of ideas Kiarostami is to be thanked and admired. But the simple human inter-relation between the two characters is never in the smallest way convincing, and there is a translated, inert feel to the dialogue." Bradshaw rated the film with two stars out of five and said that it sometimes looks like "the work of a highly intelligent and observant space alien who still has not quite grasped how Earthlings actually relate to each other." David Denby of The New Yorker called the film "fascinating, beautiful, and intentionally enraging: a brilliant return to form from a director whose work, in the past, has joined modernist game-playing to ethical propriety and modesty." In a review of Kiarostami's next film, Like Someone in Love, Denby further described Certified Copy as "nearly perverse in its ambiguity... an intricately conjoined double fiction, each tale uneasily reverberating inside its linked opposite." Stephen Holden of The New York Times compared the film to, and suggested it has drawn inspiration from, several European films from the 1950s and early 1960s, including Journey to Italy, L'Avventura and Last Year at Marienbad, as well as several films from the 1990s and 2000s: In the Mood for Love, Before Sunrise and Before Sunset.

Keith Uhlich of Time Out New York named Certified Copy the best film of 2011, calling it Kiarostami's strongest work. In 2020, Uhlich named it the best film of the 2010s.

Binoche received the Best Actress award at the Cannes prize ceremony on 23 May 2010. The actress used her acceptance speech to bring attention to the Iranian director Jafar Panahi. Panahi had been set to be in the festival's jury, but was held and imprisoned by the Iranian regime during the event. Certified Copy was later voted the forty-sixth greatest film since 2000 in an international critics' poll conducted by BBC. In July 2025, it ranked number 91 on Rolling Stone's list of "The 100 Best Movies of the 21st Century." It was also one of the films voted for the "Readers' Choice" edition of The New York Times' list of "The 100 Best Movies of the 21st Century," finishing at number 313.
