= Oswaldo Salas =

Peruvian film, TV and theater actor

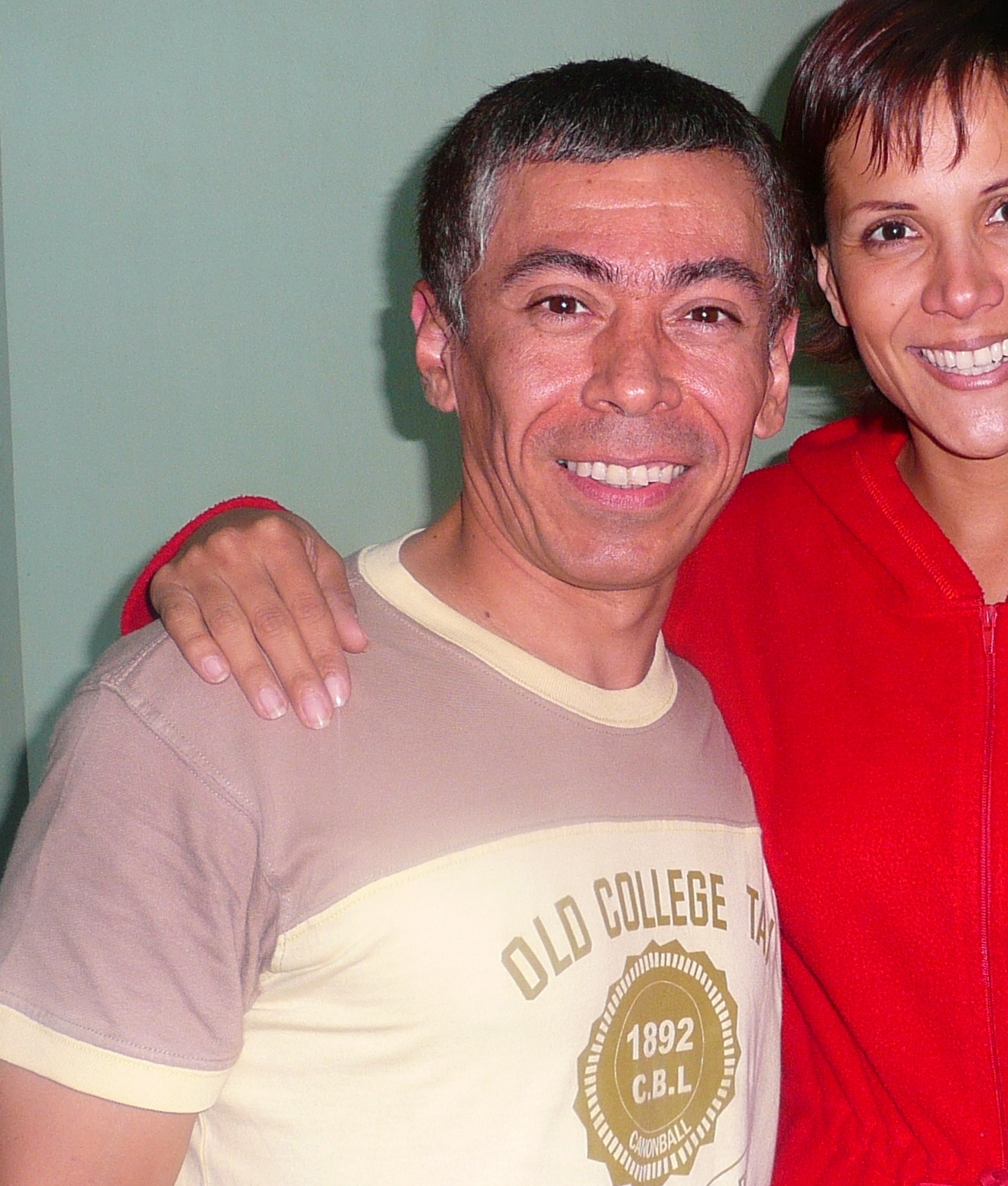
- 2008
- Born: Jorge Oswaldo Salas Williams; November 3, 1962 (age 63); Lima, Peru
- Occupation: Actor
- Years active: 1990–present

Jorge Oswaldo Salas Williams (born November 3, 1962) is a Peruvian film, TV and theater actor.

== Early life ==
Salas was born in Lima, Peru. Before dedicating himself to acting, he studied at the University of Lima where he obtained a bachelor's degree in Industrial Engineering.

== Career ==
He studied dramatic art at the Club de Teatro of Lima and several acting workshops.

His career as an actor began in the theater in 1990 with his group "Comunicando" that released several works. The most praised by both the public and the critics was Cyrano de Bergerac by Edmond Rostand, directed by Ruth Escudero. This work was named one of the five best plays premiered in Lima in 1994. It was re-released in 1995 with the same success.

His TV debut was in the 2008 successful Peruvian series "Sally, la Muñequita del Pueblo" in which he starred in the secondary role of "Pepito." In 2013 he starred in the episode "Morir por un ideal" in the Peruvian series "Historias detrás de la muerte". In 2017 he performed in the miniseries "Santa Rosa de Lima", a Peruvian co-production with the cable television network EWTN in his first antagonistic role of priest-prosecutor Francisco Verdugo.

His first film appearance was in the Peruvian film "Vidas Paralelas" in 2008.

In 2009, along with three other Peruvian actors, he provided the voices for the award-winning animated Peruvian-Argentinean film Rodencia y el Diente de la Princesa (A Mouse Tale) by David Bisbano. In 2010 he traveled to Buenos Aires, Argentina, to perform the final dubbing of the three voices (Blue the Wizard, General Rat and Edam Grandfather). He was the only Peruvian actor, whose voices were heard in the film.

In 2011, he performed in the Peruvian feature film "La Casa Rosada" by director Palito Ortega Matute. The film was finally released in 2018. Its success was hailed by audiences as well as critics.

In 2012 he worked in the multi-award-winning Peruvian film Extirpador de Idolatrías (Extirpator of Idolatries) by Manuel Siles, in which he performed the main character, police detective Waldo Mamani. In this role he won the Best Actor Award at Encuentro Mundial de Cine, in Denver, United States and at CinemAvvenire Film Festival in Rome, Italy in 2014. After the premiere in Peru in 2016, the film critic Sebastián Pimentel, from El Comercio newspaper, praised his performance with the words: "the great Oswaldo Salas". In late 2016, he was nominated by the same newspaper for Best Film Actor at Premios Luces.

In Colombia, in 2015 he starred in one of the stories of the Colombian feature film "Los Suicidios de Sara" by director Miguel Urrutia. In Peru he starred in the short film "Sonata Para un Calendario" by director Carmenrosa Vargas. The film was shown in numerous international film festivals.

In 2016 he performed in "Vivir Ilesos", the second feature film by director Manuel Siles, which premiere in Peru was on October 31, 2019.

In 2017 for the first time he was offered the role as antagonist in a film in the short film "Monstruo" by director Macarena Sturmo.

In 2018 he starred in the short film Pisahueco (Holestepper) by director Sergio Fernández Muñoz, which won in 2019 the National Short Film Contest of the Audiovisual, Phonography and New Media Department (DAFO) of the Ministry of Culture of Peru. In the evaluation report of the jury they praise his performance: "he provides an outstanding performance". He is nominated for Best Actor of the Month in January 2020 at the 12 Months Film Festival in Romania and wins the Award for Best Acting Performance in Short Film at the Košice International Monthly Film Festival in Slovakia in April 2020, the Best Actor Award at the Monthly Indie Shorts in June 2020 and more than a dozen awards at other international film festivals.

He is selected to be the first Pan American Torch Bearer of the Lima 2019 Pan American Games on the stretch of the city of Ica.

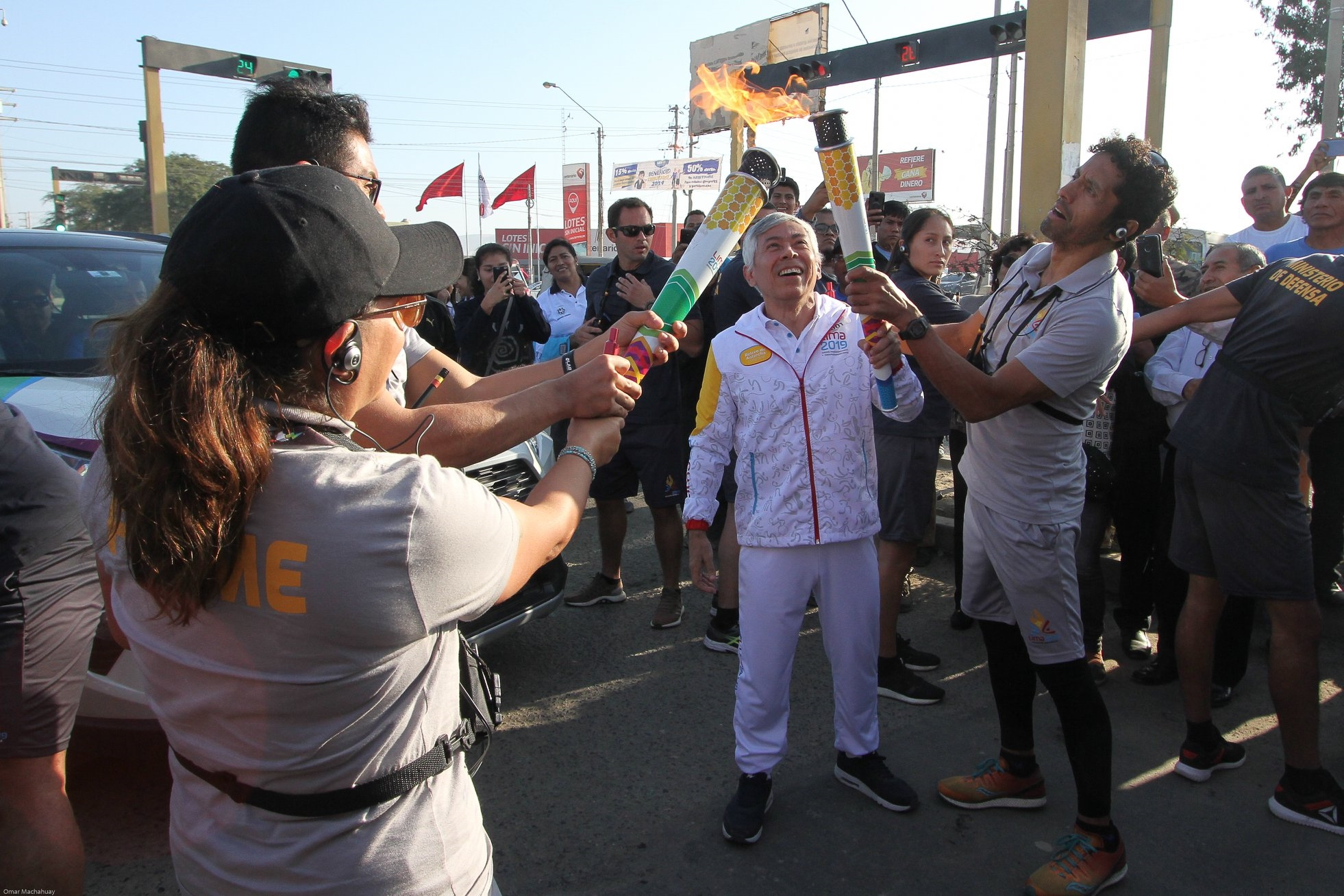
Oswaldo Salas starting his tour as the first bearer of the Lima 2019 Pan American Games in the city of Ica

He is invited to be a member of the Jury of the International Competition at the León International Film Festival, Guanajuato, Mexico, to be held in November 2020.

== Filmography ==
=== Film ===
Year	Title	Role	Director	Notes
2008	Vidas Paralelas	Judge	Rocío Lladó	
2011	La Casa Rosada	Chato	Palito Ortega Matute	
2012	Rodencia y el Diente de la Princesa	Blue the Wizard, General Rat, old Edam	David Bisbano	The English dubbed version is called A Mouse Tale
2014	La Amante del Libertador	Voice-off	Rocío Lladó	
2015	Los Suicidios de Sara	Damian	Miguel Urrutia	
2016	Extirpator of Idolatries	Waldo Mamani	Manuel Siles	
2016	Sonata for a Calendar	Alfonso	Carmenrosa Vargas	Short film
2017	Monstruo	Ulderico	Macarena Sturmo	Short film
2018	Holestepper	Angel	Sergio Fernández Muñoz	Short film
2019	Fe	Dad	Terom	
2019	Vivir Ilesos	Real estate businessman	Manuel Siles	
2020	Monstruos	Buyer	Diego Mezarina	Short film
2020	Time and Silence		Alonso Izaguirre	

=== Television ===
Year	Title	Role	Notes
2008	Sally, la Muñequita del Pueblo	Pepito	Miniseries
2009	Clave Uno: Médicos en Alerta	Antonio	Series. Season 2
2010	Leoncio Prado	Anibal Fuenzalida	Documentary
2011	Yo no me llamo Natacha	Miner	Miniseries. Season 1
2012	Solamente Milagros	Doctor	Miniseries. Episode: Positive Girl
2013	Historias detrás de la muerte	Felix Vargas Contreras	Series. Episode 22: Die for an Ideal
2017	Santa Rosa de Lima	Francisco Verdugo	Miniseries. Peruvian coproduction with EWTN
2020	Chapa tu combi	Dr. Daniel Blanco	Miniseries.

=== Videoclip ===
Year	Title	Performer	Role	Director
2014	Happy from Lima	Pharrell Williams	Himself (dancing)	Eric Miller
2017	Crónicas de un asesino	Mauricio Pappi	Mafia boss	Andre Portella
2020	Millenial	Vilchez Huamán	Parishioner	Sergio Fernández Muñoz

== Theater ==
Year	Title	Author	Role	Director	Notes
1991	The Antiquarian's Family	Carlo Goldoni	Brighella	Gerardo Angulo	
1991	El Alcalde Vanidoso	Lucy Mujica	Servant	Lucy Mujica	Based on The Emperor’s New Clothes
1992	Sinfonía de dos Brujitas	Lucy Mujica	Old puppeteer	Lucy Mujica	
1992	Bis… ¿Otra Vez?	Collective work	Pedro	Gerardo Angulo	
1993	El indio macho		Indian	Antonio Arrué	
1993	Farsa y Justicia del Señor Corregidor	Alejandro Casona	Baker	Duilio Salinas	
1993	Georges Dandin or the Confounded Husband	Molière	Lubin	Gerardo Angulo	
1994	Cyrano de Bergerac	Edmond Rostand	Ragueneau	Ruth Escudero	
1995	Cyrano de Bergerac	Edmond Rostand	Ragueneau	Ruth Escudero	Rerun
2001	Bis… ¿Otra Vez?	Collective work	Benito	Gerardo Angulo	New version
2007	La Mancha del Quijote	Gerardo Angulo	Master Pedro	Gerardo Angulo	Based on Don Quixote
2008	La Mancha del Quijote	Gerardo Angulo	Master Pedro	Gerardo Angulo	Rerun

== Awards and nominations ==
Year	Award	Country	Category	Work	Result
2014	CinemAvvenire Film Festival	Italy	Best Actor	Extirpator of Idolatries	Won
2014	Encuentro Mundial de Cine	United States	Best Actor	Extirpator of Idolatries	Won
2016	Premio Luces de El Comercio	Peru	Best Film Actor	Extirpator of Idolatries	Nominated
2020	12 Months Film Festival	Romania	Best Actor of the Month	Holestepper	Nominated
2020	Košice International Monthly Film Festival	Slovakia	Best Acting Performance in Short Film	Holestepper	Won
2020	Košice International Monthly Film Festival	Slovakia	Best Actor Feature Film	Extirpator of Idolatries	Won
2020	Prague International Monthly Film Festival (PIMFF)	Czech Republic	Best Actor Short Film	Holestepper	Finalist
2020	Prague International Monthly Film Festival (PIMFF)	Czech Republic	Best Actor Feature Film	Extirpator of Idolatries	Finalist
2020	Indie Shorts Film Festival	United States	Best Actor	Holestepper	Finalist
2020	Monthly Indie Shorts		Best Actor	Holestepper	Won
2020	VIP Film Festival	Italy	Honorable Mention for Best Actor	Holestepper	Won
2020	Madras Independent Film Festival	India	Outstanding Actor Award	Holestepper	Won
2020	Lonely Wolf: London International Film Festival	United Kingdom	Best Lead Actor Short Film	Holestepper	Won
2020	Halicarnassus Film Festival	Turkey	Best Actor	Holestepper	Won
2020	Halicarnassus Film Festival	Turkey	Best Actor	Sonata for a Calendar	Won
2020	BIMIFF - Brazil International Monthly Independent Film Festival	Brazil	Best Actor of International Medium-Length Film	Holestepper	Won
2020	Eastern Europe Film Festival	Romania	Best Actor	Holestepper	Won
2020	Accord Cine Fest		Best Actor Short	Holestepper	Won
2020	Kismet Virtual Film Festival	United States	Best Performance	Holestepper	Won
2020	Festival del Cortometraje Peruano	Peru	Best Actor	Holestepper	Won
2020	Luminous Frames Indie Festival	Denmark	Best Actor	Holestepper	Won
2020	Bucharest ShortCut Cinefest	Romania	Best Actor	Holestepper	Nominated
2020	GIMFA - Gralha International Monthly Film Awards	Brazil	Best Actor of Short Film	Holestepper	Won
2020	1st Monthly Film Festival	Serbia	Best Actor Short Film	Holestepper	Won
2020	Film In Focus International Film Festival	Romania	Best Actor	Holestepper	Nominated
2020	New Wave Short Film Festival	Germany	Best Actor	Holestepper	Won
2020	Under The Stars International Film Festival	Italy	Best Actor	Sonata for a Calendar	Nominated
2020	Pure Magic International Film Festival	Netherlands	The Honor Award (to the director, cast and crew)	Holestepper	Won
