= Ali Atshani =

Iranian film director, screenwriter and film producer

- Born: 16 May 1978 (age 48); Isfahan, Iran
- Occupations: Director, Producer, Screenwriter
- Years active: 1994–present

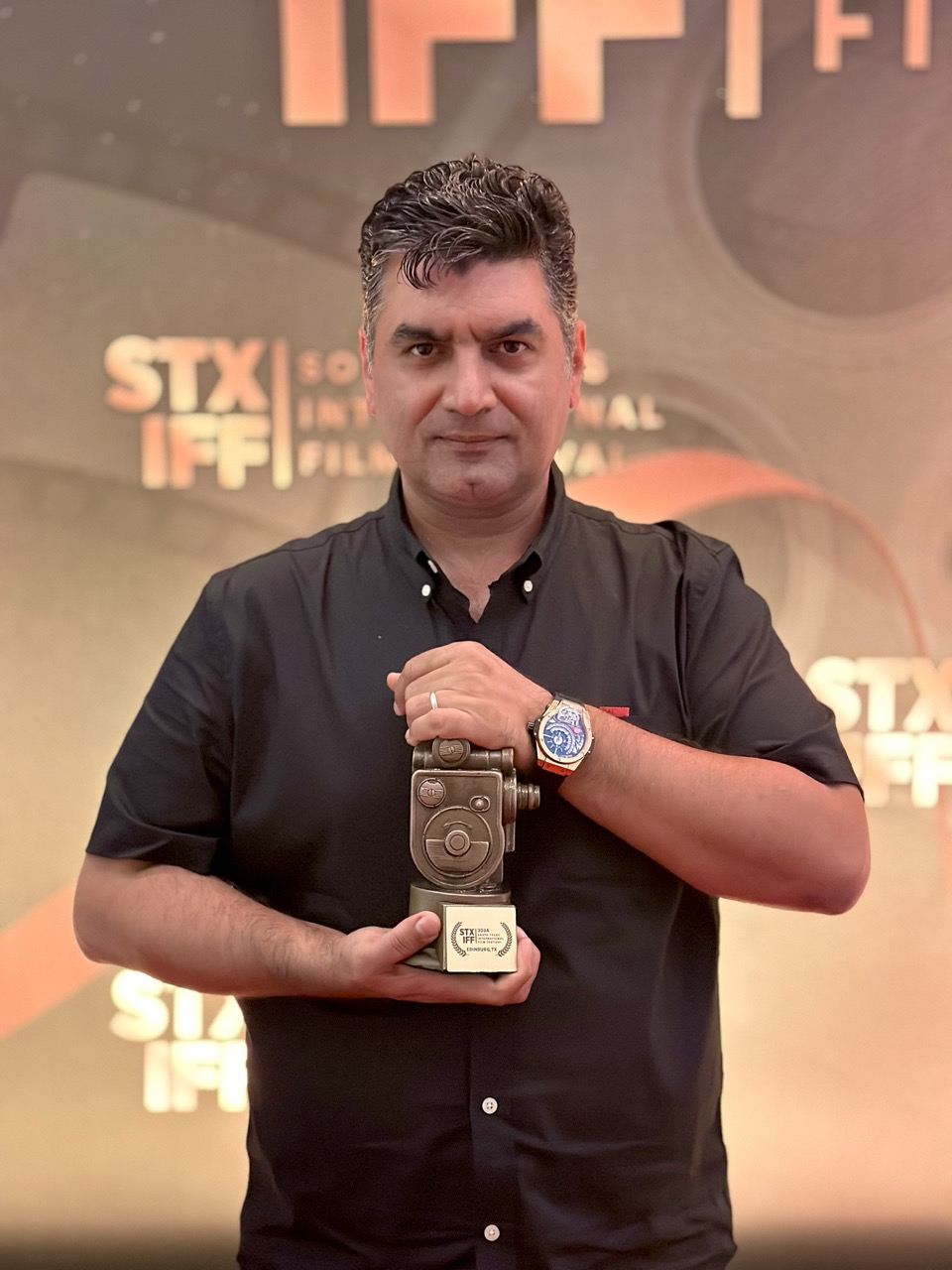

Ali Atshani (Persian: علی عطشانی; born May 16, 1978) is an Iranian film director, film producer and screenwriter.

Atshani started his career in 1994 and made his film debut in the drama film Habib. In 2002, Atshani directed a documentary called Unfinished, about religious rituals in Iran. Because of the high sensitivity of this subject in the Iranian society, the documentary was banned by the government and never distributed in Iran. In 2011, he directed The President's Cell Phone, a film about Mahmoud Ahmadinejad. The film was shot over a period of one year. In 2013, Atshani directed the first 3D movie in the history of Iranian cinema, called Mr. Alef.

== Filmography ==
Year	Title	Credited as
1994	Habib	Director & Writer
2003	Unfinished	Director & Producer
2004	Forgotten Positives	Director & Producer
2005	One Step to God	Director
2006	Banana Peel	Director & Producer
2009	Sky Track	Director
2010	Democracy in Daylight	Director
2010	Captain	Director
2011	Along City	Director
2012	The President's Cell Phone	Director
2013	Mr. Alef	Director
2014	Negar's Role	Director & Producer
2014	Keep It Between Us	Director
2016	Paradise	Director & Producer
2017	Wishbone	Director & Producer
2017	Reversed Seven	Producer
2018	Katyusha	Director & Producer
2018	Selfie with Democracy	Director & Producer
2019	1st Born	Director & Producer
2021	Paper Dream	Director & Producer
2021	Loteria	Director & Producer
2023	My Little Moon	Director & Producer
