= Reza Sixo Safai =

American actor

- Born: 1972; Iran
- Citizenship: United States
- Education: UCLA
- Occupations: Actor, producer, director
- Years active: 2001–present
- Spouse: Hollace Starr
- Children: 1 daughter

Reza Sixo Safai (Persian: رضا سیکسو صفایی) is an Iranian-born American director, actor and producer.

== Filmography ==
Year	Movie	Role	Note
2001	F-Stops	Shane Ketterick	
2001	Dean Quixote	Don Armstrong	
2005	The Man Who Couldn't	Cousin Jake	
2009	Sabotage	—N/a	Writer and Director
2010	The Mentalist (TV series)	Dr. Jason Kaseem	1 Episode: Season 2, Episode 16
2011	Undercovers (TV series)	Businessman	1 Episode: Season 1, Episode 13
2011	Circumstance	Mehran Hakimi	
2012	A Better Place Than This	The Hangman	Short Film
2013	A Girl Walks Home Alone at Night	Rockabilly	
2013	Prevertere	David	
2013	Meet Me in Montenegro	Kingsly	
2014	Teacher in a Box	Mr. Carl	Short Film
2015	Shah Bob	Bob	
2016	The Persian Connection	Behrouz	Co-writer
2016	Austin Found	Jose	
2019	1st Born	Ben	
2021	Prisoners of the Ghostland	—N/a	Co-writer and co-producer
2022	Blackout	—N/a	Co-producer
