= Lina from Lima =

- TIFF release poster
- Directed by: María Paz González
- Written by: María Paz González
- Produced by: Fernando Bascuñán; Giancarlo Nasi Cañas; Maite Alberdi
- Starring: Magaly Solier
- Cinematography: Benjamín Echazarreta
- Edited by: Ana Remón
- Music by: Cali Flores; José Manuel Gatica
- Production companies: Don Quijote Films; Gema Films; Carapulkra Films
- Release dates: September 5, 2019 (TIFF); December 5, 2020 (Online); March 24, 2022 (Peru)
- Running time: 80 minutes
- Countries: Chile; Peru; Argentina
- Languages: Spanish; Creole; Quechua

Lina from Lima (Spanish: Lina de Lima) is a 2019 musical drama film written and directed by María Paz González in her directorial debut. Starring Magaly Solier. It won several awards including "Best Chilean Feature Film" and the Héctor Ríos Award for "Best Direction of Photography" at the Valdivia International Film Festival. It is a co-production between Chile, Peru and Argentina.

The film was named on the shortlist for Chilean's entry for the Academy Award for Best International Feature Film at the 93rd Academy Awards, but it was not selected.

== Synopsis ==
Lina is a Peruvian migrant living in Chile, she supports her family from a distance by working for someone else in Santiago. This year, as she prepares for her annual Christmas trip to see her teenage son, Lina realizes she no longer needs her. Feeling emotionally displaced, she begins a journey where she redefines herself as she explores her own desires and identity.

== Cast ==
The actors participating in this film are:

- Magaly Solier as Lina
- Emilia Ossandon as Clara
- Herode Joseph as Maurice
- Betty Villalta as Betty
- Exequiel Alvear as Exequiel
- James González as Junior
- Cecilia Cartasegna as Alicia
- Edgardo Castro as Juan
- Javiera Contador as Carmen
- Sebastián Brahm as Manuel
- Alberto Tenorio as Walter
- Domitila Castillo as Lina's mother
- Ingrid Cevallos as Singer
- Miguel Perea as Cité's Owner
- Ítalo Suárez as Teacher 2
- Brian Montalvo as Dancer 1
- Diego Olivares as Dancer 2
- Ricardo León as Dancer 3
- Camilo Toro as Dancer 4
- Catalina Aros as Lina's double 1
- Geraldine Raud as Lina's double 2
- Félix Acosta as Boy in Lina's room
- Liliana Meza as Shop saleswoman

== Release ==
It had its world premiere on September 5, 2019, in the Discovery section of the Toronto International Film Festival. Its commercial release was scheduled for November 2019 in theaters in Chile and in Peru sometime in 2020. However, its release was delayed until March 19, 2020, due to the social outbreak that occurred in October. But it was delayed again due to the COVID-19 pandemic. Finally, it was released on December 5, 2020, online to then premiere on March 24, 2022, in Peruvian theaters.

== Reception ==
=== Critical reception ===
On the review aggregator website Rotten Tomatoes, 87% of 15 critics' reviews are positive, with an average rating of 7.2/10.

=== Accolades ===
Year	Award / Festival	Category	Recipient	Result	Ref.
2019	Valdivia International Film Festival	Best Chilean Feature Film	Lina from Lima	Won	
2019	Valdivia International Film Festival	Héctor Ríos Award - Best Direction of Photography	Benjamín Echazarreta	Won	
2019	Mar del Plata International Film Festival	Best Ibero-American Film	Lina from Lima	Nominated	
2020	Chilean Film Festival	Best Actress	Magaly Solier	Won	
2020	Quilpué Chilean Film Festival	Best Art Direction	Lina from Lima	Won	
2020	Quilpué Chilean Film Festival	Best Male Cast	Lina from Lima	Won	
2020	Quilpué Chilean Film Festival	Best Actress	Magaly Solier	Won	
2020	Cleveland International Film Festival	New Directors Competition - Best Film	Lina from Lima	Won	
2020	Miami International Film Festival	HBO Ibero-American Competition - Best Film	Lina from Lima	Nominated	
2020	Miami International Film Festival	Jordan Ressler First Feature Award	Lina from Lima	Nominated	
2020	Palm Springs International Film Festival	New Voices New Visions Award	Lina from Lima	Nominated	
2021	Argentinean Film Critics Association Awards	Best Film in co-production with Argentina	Lina from Lima	Won	
