= Queen of the Desert (film) =

- Theatrical release poster
- Directed by: Werner Herzog
- Screenplay by: Werner Herzog
- Produced by: Michael Benaroya; Cassian Elwes; Nick N. Raslan
- Starring: Nicole Kidman; James Franco; Damian Lewis; Jay Abdo; Robert Pattinson
- Cinematography: Peter Zeitlinger
- Edited by: Joe Bini
- Music by: Klaus Badelt; Mark Yaeger
- Production companies: Benaroya Pictures; Evolution Entertainment; H Films; Palmyra Films
- Distributed by: IFC Films
- Release dates: February 6, 2015 (Berlin); April 14, 2017
- Running time: 128 minutes
- Country: United States
- Language: English
- Budget: $36 million
- Box office: $2 million

Queen of the Desert is a 2015 American epic biographical drama film written and directed by Werner Herzog and is based on the life of British traveller, writer, archaeologist, explorer, cartographer and political officer Gertrude Bell. The film follows Bell's life chronologically, from her early twenties until her death. It was Herzog's first feature film in six years after his 2009 film My Son, My Son, What Have Ye Done?

The film stars Nicole Kidman, James Franco, Damian Lewis and Robert Pattinson. After going through many delays and casting problems, production finally took place from December 2013 to March 2014 in Morocco, Jordan and England. It was screened in the main competition section of the 65th Berlin International Film Festival and had its premiere on February 6, 2015. It had a theatrical release in Germany on September 3, 2015.

The film received mostly negative reviews from critics and was also a major financial disappointment, grossing $2 million against a $36 million production budget.

== Premise ==
Gertrude Bell, a daughter of wealthy British parents, has no interest in the social life of the London elite. Balls, receptions, and a life of privilege bring her only boredom. Aspiring to some usefulness in her life, Gertrude decides to join her uncle, who occupies a high diplomatic position in Tehran. There the young lady not only encounters the Near East but also falls in love with an embassy employee, Henry Cadogan. However, their romance does not last long as her parents consider the young man a poor matrimonial choice for their daughter and forbid the marriage. Devastated, Henry dies by suicide, unable to renounce his true love. For the remainder of her life Gertrude Bell completely devotes herself to exploring and writing about the Near East. Her knowledge of the tribal leaders is used by the British to establish the Kingdoms of Iraq, Jordan and Saudi Arabia.

== Cast ==
- Nicole Kidman as Gertrude Bell
- James Franco as Henry Cadogan
- Damian Lewis as "Richard" Charles Doughty-Wylie
- Robert Pattinson as T. E. Lawrence
- Christopher Fulford as Winston Churchill
- Mark Lewis Jones as Frank Lascelles
- Jenny Agutter as Florence Bell
- Holly Earl as Cousin Florence
- Beth Goddard as Aunt Lascelles
- Michael Jenn as R. Campbell Thompson
- Assaad Bouab as Sheikh
- Jay Abdo as Fattouh, Bell's guide
- David Calder as Hugh Bell
- Nick Waring as Mark Sykes
- Sam Kanater as Dulaim
- Sophie Linfield as Judith Doughty-Wylie
- William Ellis as Earl of Chester
- John Wark as Arnold Runcie
- Younes Bouab as King Faisal
- Fehd Benchemsi as Ibrahim
- Ismael Kanater as Dulaim
- Anas Chrifi as Emir

== Production ==
=== Casting ===
Talking about casting difficulties and delay in shooting of the film, Herzog said, "There are some actors I’d very much like to be in the film and it’s problematic to get them in the same place at the same time." Naomi Watts was originally cast in the role of Gertrude Bell but was later replaced by Nicole Kidman. Kidman, talking about her role, said, "She's the female Lawrence of Arabia. She was English, and basically defined the borders between Iraq and Jordan that exist today, borders that she negotiated between Churchill and different Arab leaders. She went out to the desert with the Bedouin and all the different tribes that were feuding at the turn of the 20th century." Jude Law was initially cast in the role of Henry Cadogan but later dropped out due to scheduling conflicts and was replaced by James Franco.

Robert Pattinson and Damian Lewis joined the cast of the film as T. E. Lawrence and Charles Doughty-Wylie, respectively. On casting Pattinson in the film, Herzog said that " I needed an Englishman who still looks like a schoolboy but which is very smart. He plays Lawrence of Arabia, but at the age of 22, on an archeological site. Kidman, who plays the main role is wondering what that kid has to do in a place like this, and an archeologist tells her that this kid has a PhD." Pattinson talking about portraying Lawrence, said that "It’s sort of close to the real guy, it’s certainly not [the film] Lawrence of Arabia-like, at the same time the guy was really small and I’m not physically kind of right for the part, but I think I have quite a good little handle of who he is. After I got cast I started researching and there are certain things you can’t do as I’m just not physically the same so I had to invent it a little bit, and it’s a small part as well. The film’s about Gertrude Bell, it’s really not about making Lawrence of Arabia." Nick N. Raslan, one of the producers of the film, also appeared the film in a cameo appearance.

Main cast and the people they are portraying in the film

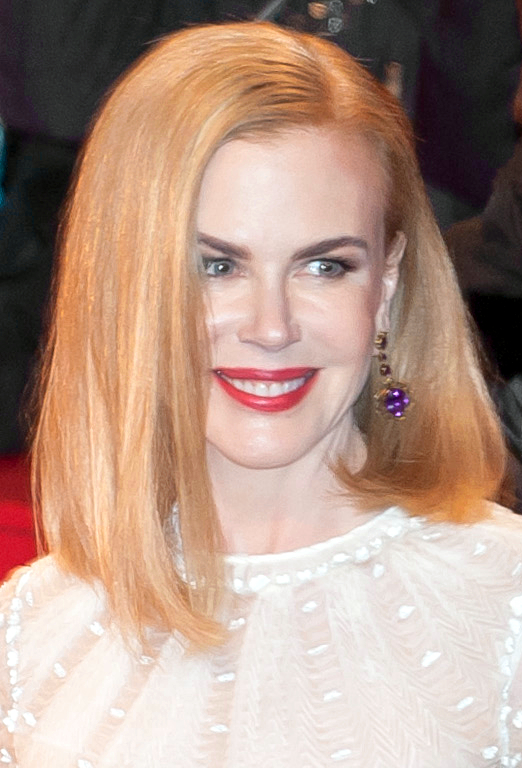
Nicole Kidman

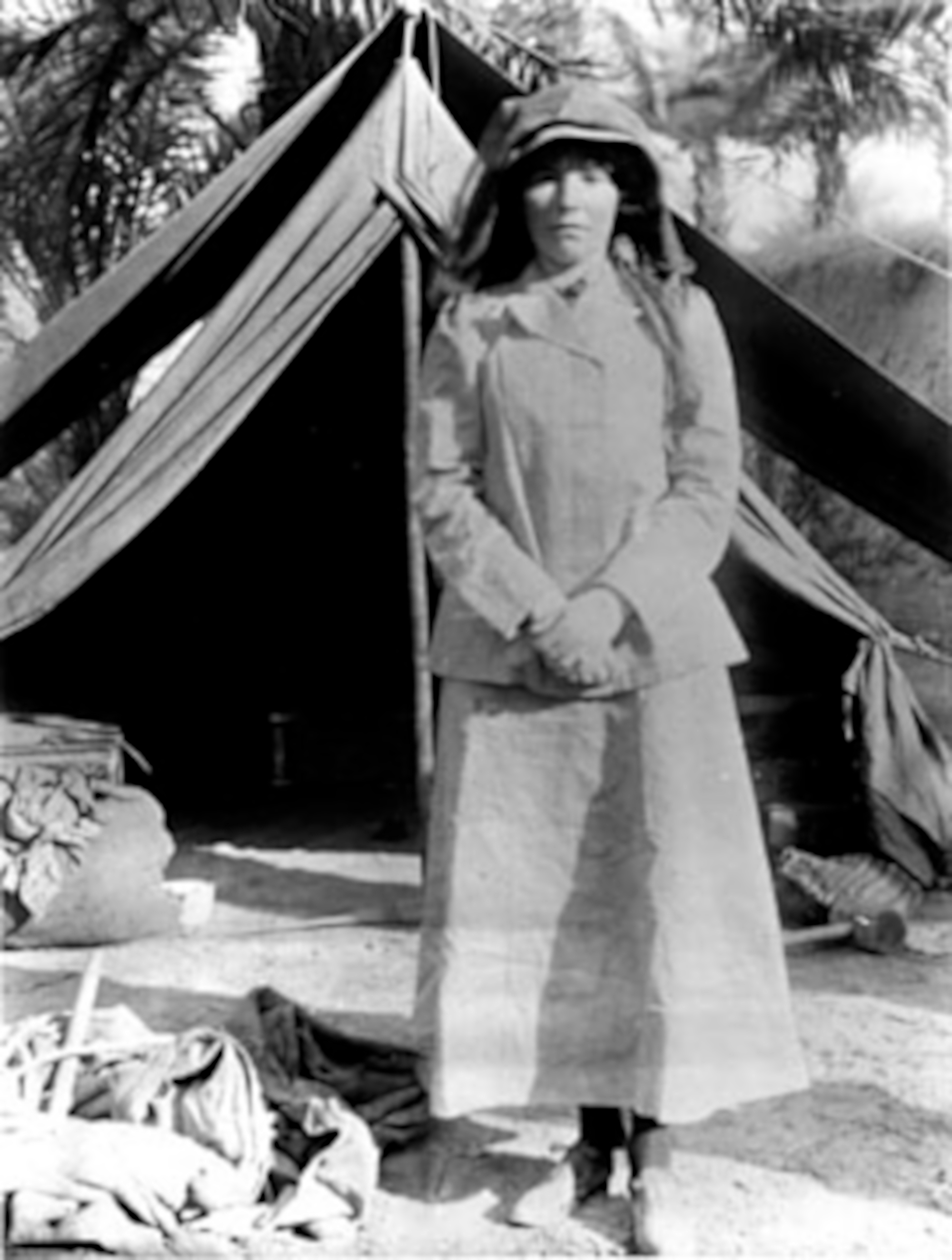
Gertrude Bell

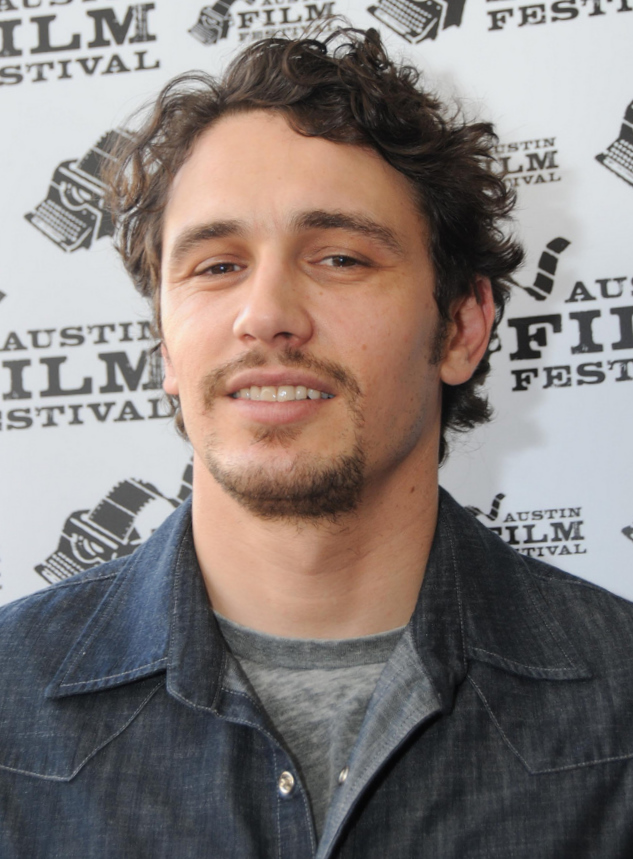
James Franco

Henry Cadogan

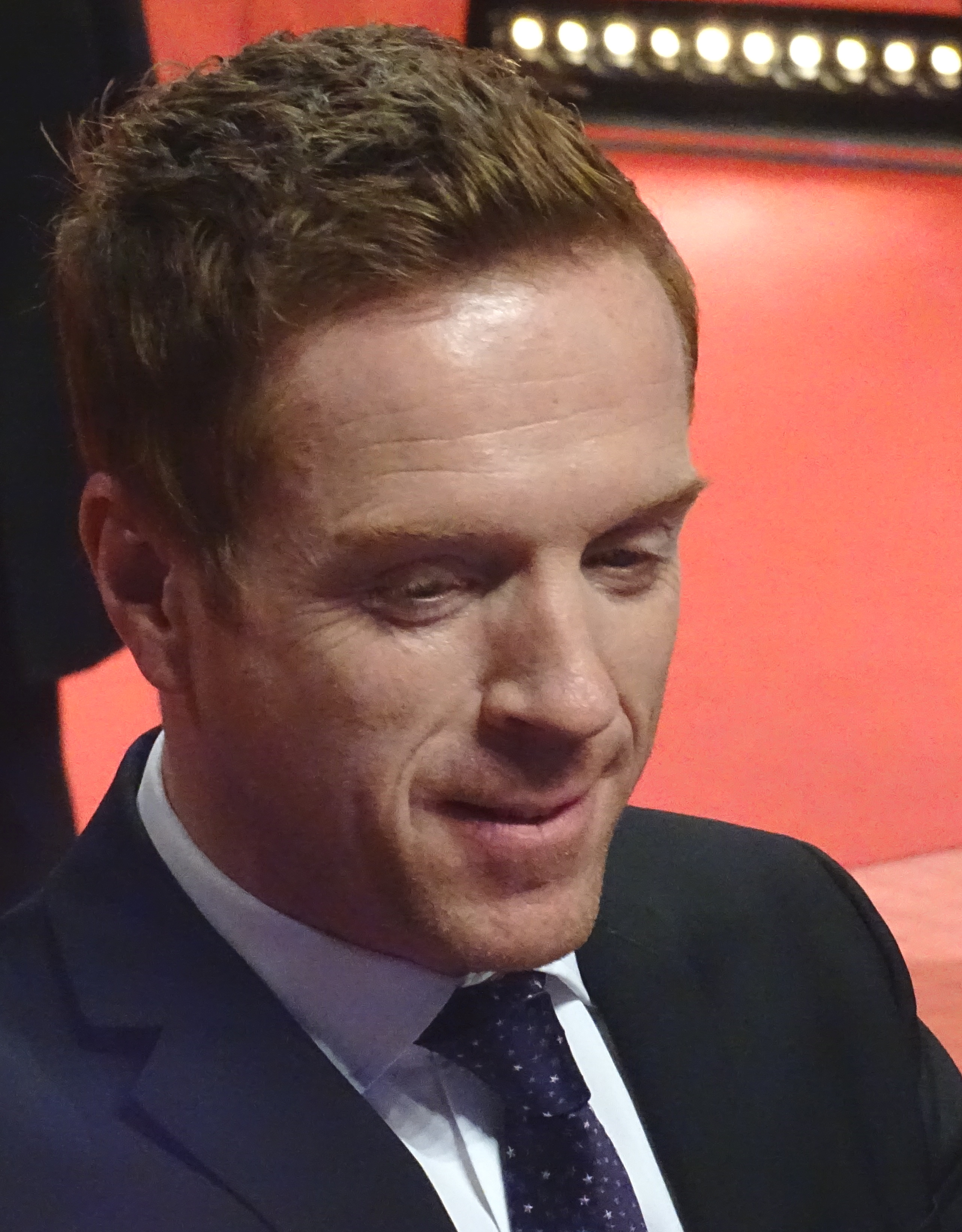
Damian Lewis

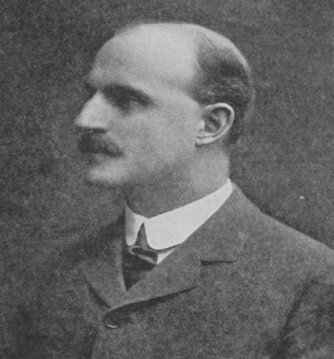
Charles Doughty-Wylie

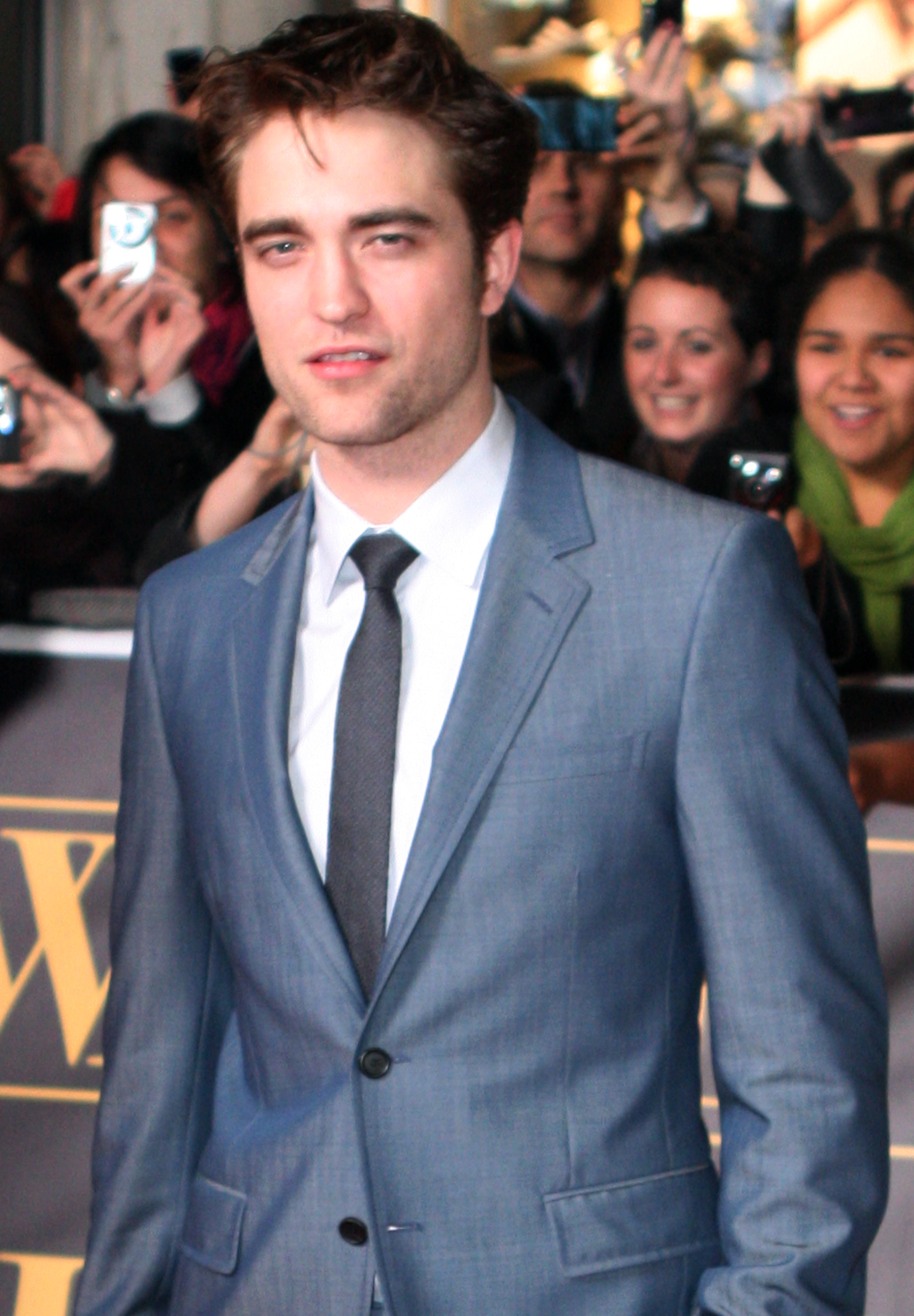
Robert Pattinson

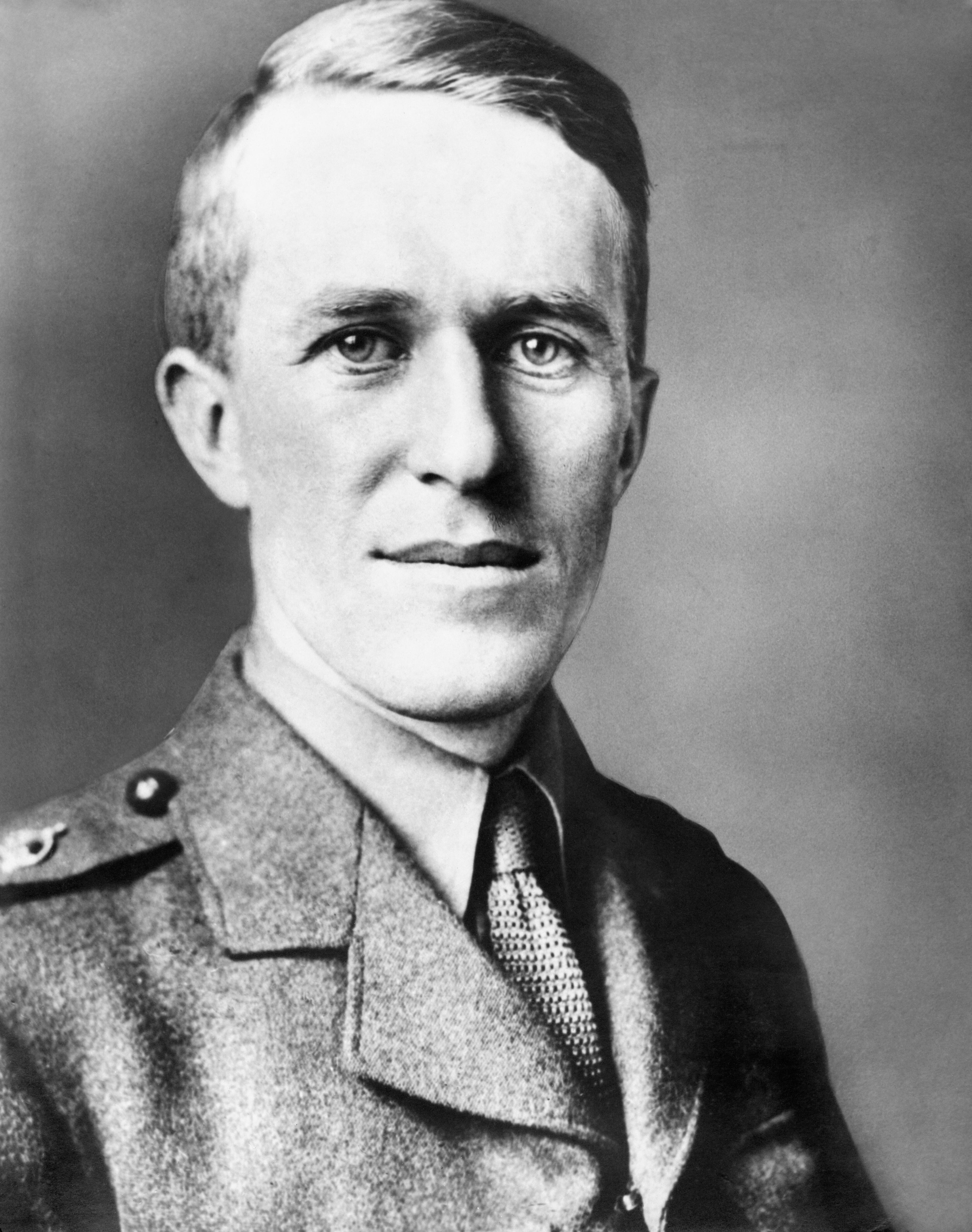
T. E. Lawrence

=== Filming ===
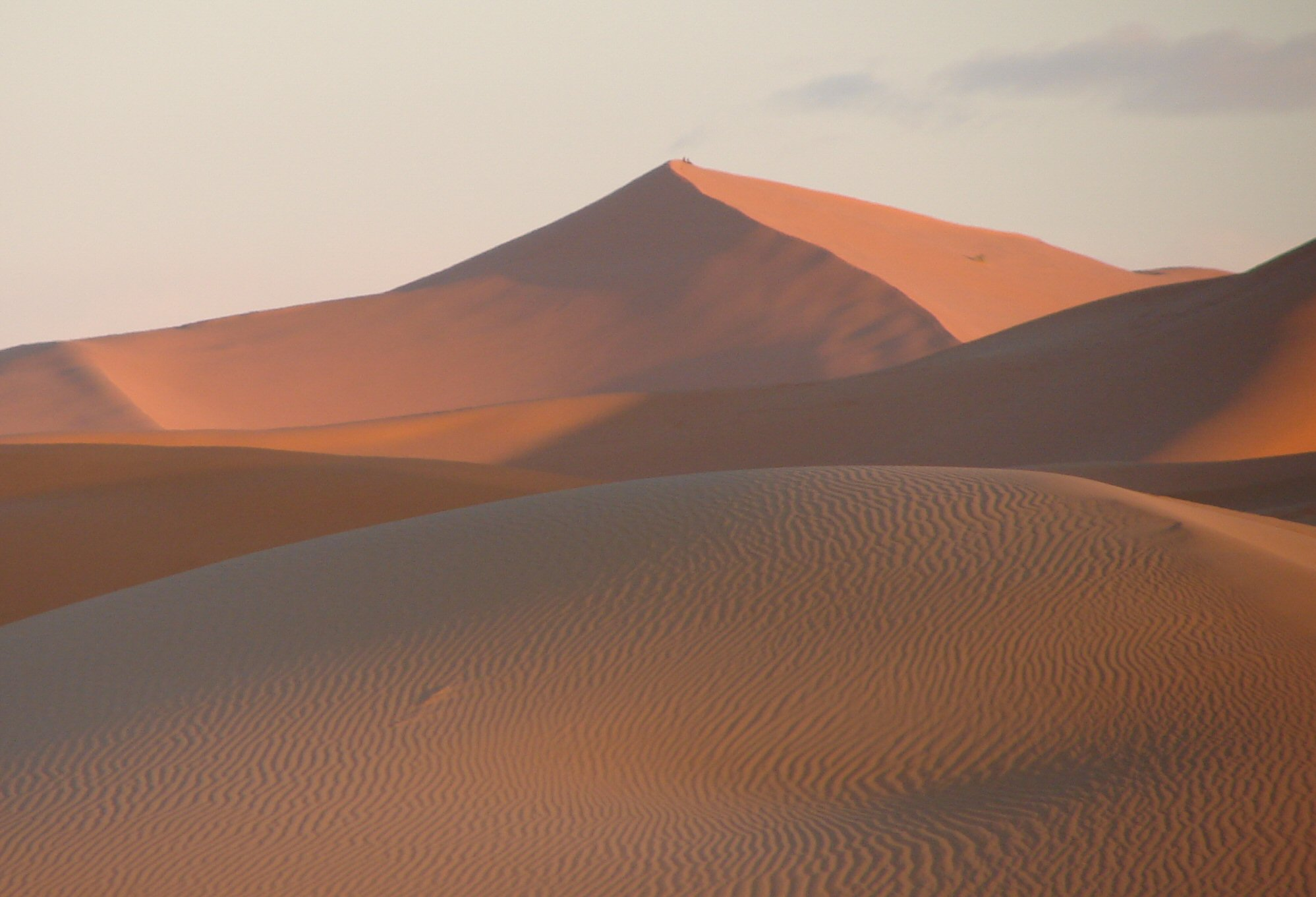
Scenes were filmed at Merzouga, Morocco.

Principal photography began on December 20, 2013. Herzog shot background scenes and establishing shots without the principal cast in Merzouga, Morocco and Petra, Jordan. Principal photography with the main cast started in Merzouga on January 13, 2014. Filming also took place at Marrakesh and Erfoud and continued till February 26, 2014, in Ouarzazate, Morocco. After Morocco, filming moved to London and finished on March 6, 2014.

A major portion of filming took place in Morocco. Fifty actors (apart from main cast), more than 1,500 extras and 65 technicians, all Moroccan, participated.

== Releases ==
The film premiered at the 65th Berlin International Film Festival in February 2015. It had a theatrical release in Germany on September 3, 2015. A different cut of the film was screened at AFI Fest in November 2015. Originally, Atlas Distribution Co. acquired the US distribution rights of the film and planned to have a wide release in fall 2015. However, IFC Films later acquired distribution rights with a planned spring 2017 release.

== Reception ==
=== Critical response ===
The film received mostly negative reviews from critics, but the performance of Kidman was praised. On the review aggregator website Rotten Tomatoes, 18% of 80 critics' reviews are positive, with an average rating of 4.3/10. The website's consensus reads: "Queen of the Desert unites some undeniably talented professionals, but it's difficult to discern what drew them together -- or understand how its compelling real-life story became such a muddled mess." The critical aggregator website Metacritic gave the film a score of 39 out of 100 based on 18 reviews.

Peter Bradshaw of The Guardian gave the film two out of five stars, saying that "Werner Herzog’s biopic of English adventurer Gertrude Bell is impeccably mounted, competently made, entirely respectable – and a bit of a plod" and praised Kidman and Pattinson that "she (Kidman) does a perfectly reasonable job with this difficult role and she is well cast" and "Pattinson carried off this (minor) role well enough." Peter Debruge of Variety called the film a "compelling but dramatically underpowered epic" and notes that "Kidman convincingly manages to play Bell as a delicate yet determined twentysomething, forging her way across untamed deserts, but still fragile enough to fall in love on two separate occasions."

David Rooney of The Hollywood Reporter called it "A passionless trudge that lacks both sweep and psychological complexity", but ultimately praised Kidman and Pattinson that "(Pattinson has) brief but significant appearances" and "she (Kidman) carries the film more than competently." Jessica Kiang of Indiewire in her review said that "'Queen of the Desert' is such a disappointment when you consider the wild portraits of pioneers that Herzog has given us before, that he's so reverent here." And praising the cast added that "(Pattinson, out of all) of the actors not overwhelmed by the heavy sense" and "(Lewis) who handles the role of the married consul, whose amused admiration for Bell flares into love with a deftness that had us palpably relaxing during his scenes."

Mark Adams of Screen International gave the film a mixed review, as he notes that "While enjoyable in parts, its episodic pacing lets down the real-life story of a bold and remarkable woman." Geoffrey Macnab of The Independent said that "This is the closest Herzog has come to making a conventional Hollywood movie – what it lacks is the perversity, drive and wildness that are usually his hallmark."

=== Accolades ===
Year	Group/Award	Category	Recipient	Result	Ref.
2015	Berlin International Film Festival	Golden Bear	Werner Herzog	Nominated	

== See also ==
- Lawrence of Arabia (film)
