= Tara Thaller =

Croatian actress (born 1998)

- Born: Tara Filipović; 31 March 1998 (age 27); Zagreb, Croatia
- Occupation: Actress
- Years active: 2014–present
- Spouse: Faris Pinjo (m. 2021; div. 2023)

Tara Thaller (née Filipović; born 31 March, 1998) is a Croatian actress best known for her role in HBO's TV series Uspjeh.

== Biography ==
Tara Filipović was born in Zagreb, Croatia, and was raised alongside two siblings. In 2018, Thaller appeared as a contestant in a Croatian quiz-show Volim Hrvatsku, and in spring 2019, she won the Croatian version of BBC's singing show Just the Two of Us in pair with Croatian singer Dino Jelusić.

Following several supporting roles primarily in Croatian films and TV series, Thaller then appeared as Blanka in Uspjeh, broadcast in 2019. She later played in a Swiss film titled The Saint of the Impossible.

She adopted the surname Thaller, derived from her great-grandmother's maiden name, informally using it on social media platforms. She formally changed her last name following her film debut.

== Filmography ==
=== Movies ===
- Ljubav ili smrt (2014)
- Ibiza (2018)
- The Saint of the Impossible (2020)

=== Television ===
- Čuvar dvorca (2017)
- Pogrešan čovjek (2018-2019)
- Uspjeh (2019)

=== Dubbing ===
- Soy Luna (2018)
- Raya and the Last Dragon (2021)
