= José María Morales (film producer) =

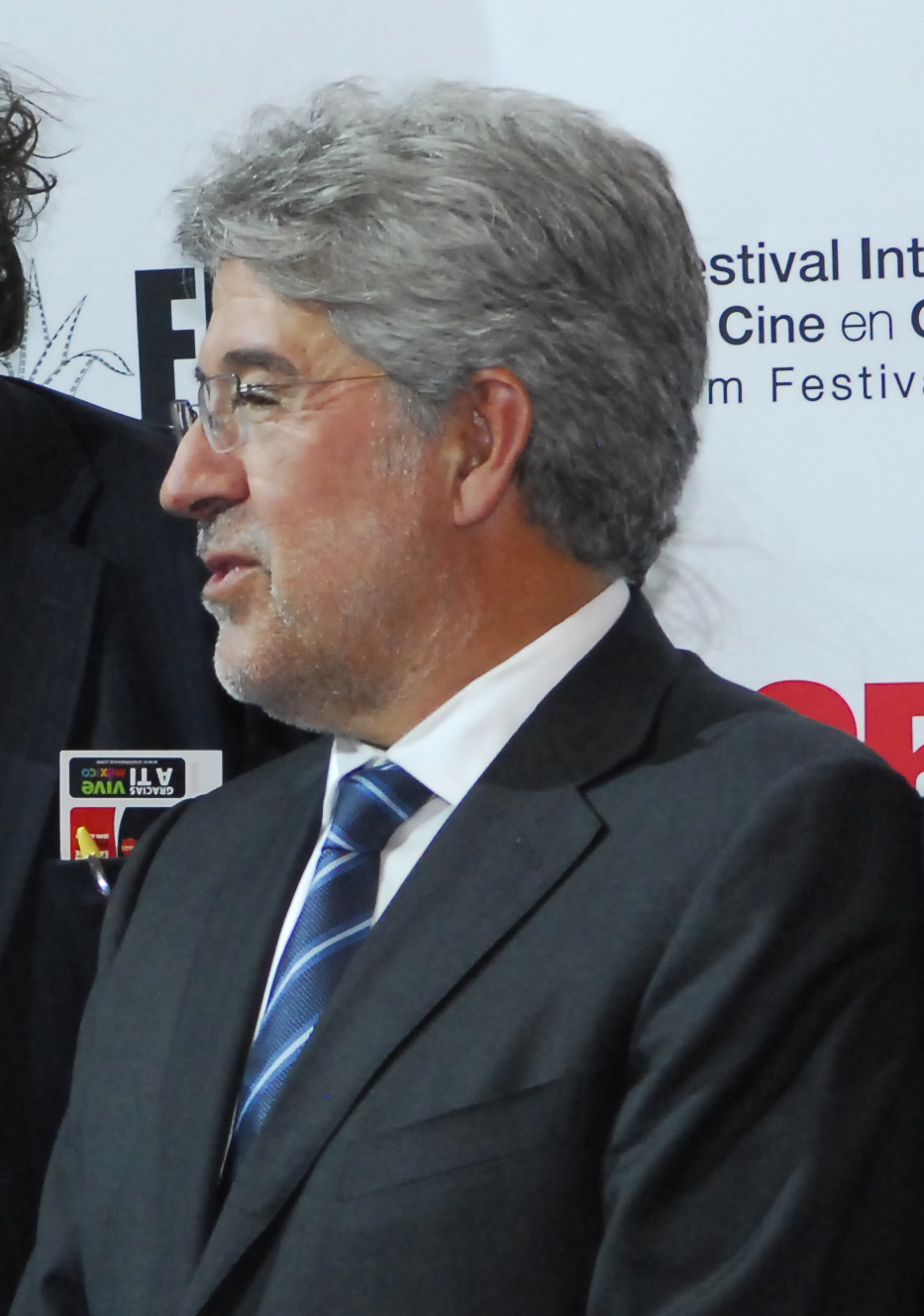
José María Morales

José María Morales is a Spanish film producer and founder of Madrid-based film distributor Wanda Films in 1992.

He produced La Teta Asustada (The Milk of Sorrow), which won the Golden Bear at the 59th Berlin International Film Festival and was nominated for the Academy Award for Best Foreign Language Film in 2010. He was a member of the jury at the 60th Berlin International Film Festival.

En 2022 recibió el premio Rayo Verde de la Academia de Cine y Greenpeace por su carrera como productor de documentales y películas de naturaleza.
