= Marc Raymond Wilkins =

Swiss film director and screenwriter

- Born: 1976 (age 49–50); Bern, Switzerland
- Years active: 1992-present
- Notable work: Bon Voyage

Marc Raymond Wilkins is a Swiss-British film director and screenwriter. His 2016 film Bon Voyage was entered into the 89th Academy Awards. He was chosen, as one of the world's top young directors at the “New Directors Showcase” in Cannes, in 2013.

== Selected filmography ==
=== Director ===
- TAKSI MUNICH (1999)
- Twilight (2008)
- Hotel Pennsylvania (2013)
- Bon Voyage (2016)
- The Saint of the Impossible (2020)

=== Writer ===
- Bon Voyage (2016)
- Twilight (2008)

=== Producer ===
- Twilight (2008)
- Leroy cleans up (2006)
- Nass (2001)

== Awards and nominations ==
- Bon Voyage
  - San Diego International Film Festival - Best Short Film Award
  - San Diego International Film Festival - Best Narrative Short Award
  - Palm Springs International Festival of Short Films - Best Live Action Short over 15 minutes
  - Jury Prize for best short at the Jozi International Shortfilm Festival 2016, South Africa
  - Swiss Film Academy 2017 – Best short film
  - The golden knight international short film festival, Golden knight award 2016
- Hotel Pennsylvania
  - Audience Award the Festival Séquence court-métrage Toulous 2013
  - Nomination for Best Casting at the Artois Award by the Casting Society of America
- Twilight
  - Official selection of the Hof International Film Festival in 2008
