= Claudia Llosa =

Peruvian film director, screenwriter, and producer (born 1976)

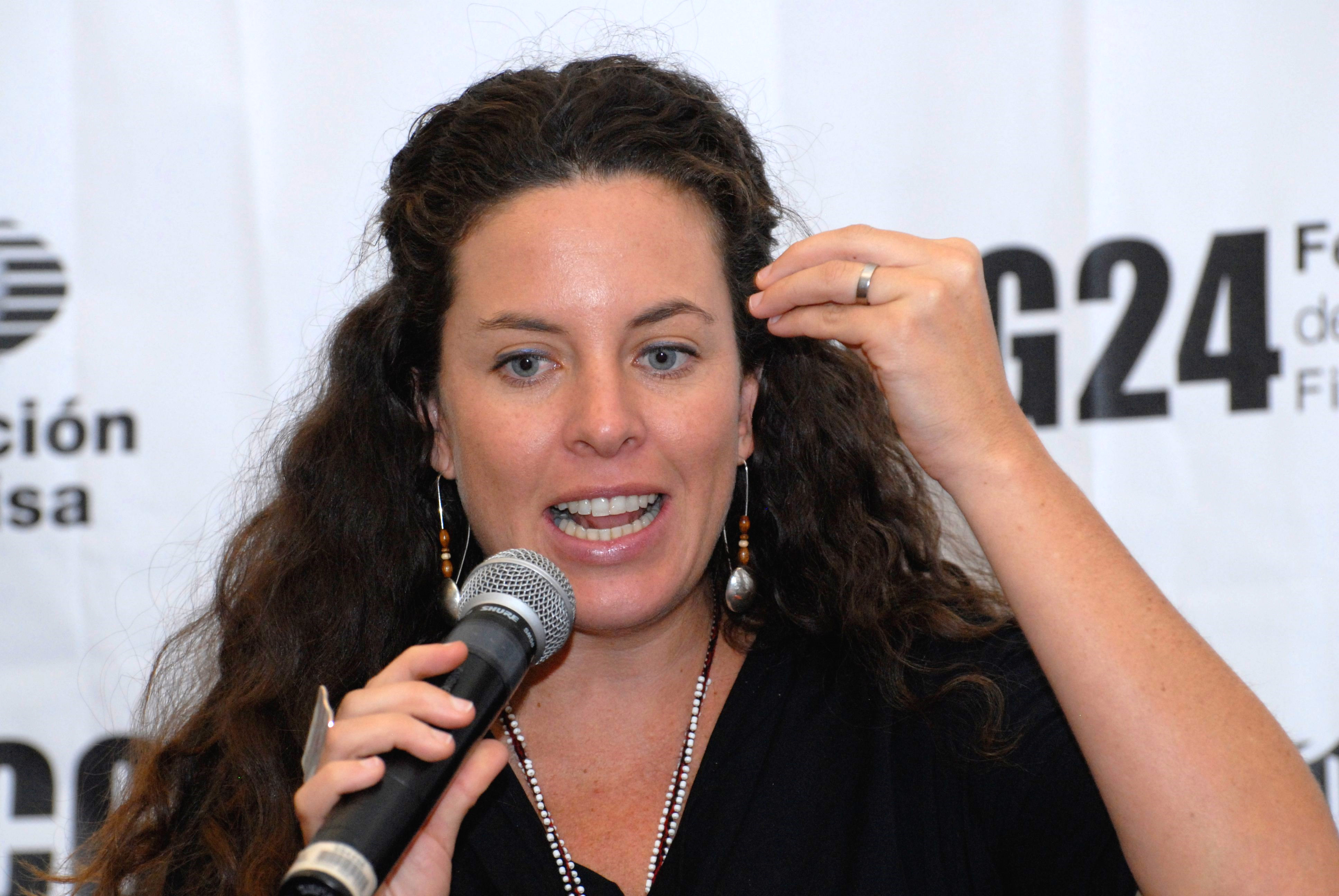
- Guadalajara Film Festival
- Born: Claudia Llosa Bueno; November 15, 1976 (age 49); Lima, Peru
- Occupation: Director Writer Producer

Claudia Llosa Bueno (born 15 November 1976) is a Peruvian film director, writer, producer, and author. She is recognized for her Academy-Award-nominated film, The Milk of Sorrow.

== Early life ==
Claudia Llosa was born on November 15, 1976, in Lima, Peru. Her mother, Patricia Bueno Risso, is an artist from Italy and her father, Alejandro Llosa Garcia worked in the engineering field. Her siblings are Patricia Llosa and Andrea Llosa. She is the niece of the Peruvian writer Mario Vargas Llosa and the film director Luis Llosa.

She studied at Newton College in Lima. Her post-secondary studies were spent majoring in Film Direction at the University of Lima.

Llosa moved from Peru to Madrid in the late 1990s. From 1998 to 2001, she studied there at the film academy Escuela TAI. At the end of her studies, she started working on the script for Madeinusa. She moved to Barcelona to work in the advertising industry.

== Career ==
Claudia Llosa’s first film, Madeinusa tells the story of a rural and religious village in Peru. In Madeinusa, events occur over the Easter season due to the belief that during this period of time, a person can sin without being punished. Madeinusa premiered in competition at Sundance Festival 2006, where it was nominated for the Grand Jury Prize, won the prize for the best unpublished script at the 2003 Havana Film Festival and received several international awards, including the FIPRESCI international critics award at Rotterdam Festival and the Best Latin American Film Award at Malaga Festival, among others.

In 2009, Llosa finished her second film, The Milk of Sorrow (La teta asustada). The Milk of Sorrow was inspired by the era of terrorism by the Shining Path (Sendero Luminoso), which the citizens of Peru experienced between 1980 and 1992. This era gave rise to the Andean folk belief, which this movie is based on, that women who experienced trauma during this period of time would pass on their anxieties to their children through their breast milk. The film was shot over a period of six weeks, with filming locations in Lima or near the capital. The film was written and directed by Claudia Llosa and the creation of The Milk of Sorrow included the help of cinematographer Natasha Braier and camera operator Guillermo Garcia Meza. The film was shortlisted for the 59th Berlin International Film Festival. It was the first Peruvian film nominated for the Golden Bear Award and won the main award. Llosa's film also gained recognition from awards such as FIPRESCI in 2009 and multiple awards at the Lima Film Festival. In Lima, Peru, The Milk of Sorrow outsold the ticket sales of the film Slumdog Millionaire during its premiere. However, in the more rural communities of Peru The Milk of Sorrow did not gain the same reception.

On February 2, 2010, Llosa's The Milk of Sorrow was nominated for the Academy Award in the Best Foreign Film Category. Also, in 2010, Claudia Llosa was invited to become a member of Hollywood’s Academy of Motion Picture Arts and Sciences.

According to film scholar Sarah Barrows, Claudia Llosa’s films do not portray stereotypes of the indigenous communities of Peru. Although Llosa does not portray these stereotypes, her films do not always receive a positive reaction from these communities due to the more serious depiction of them in films and the subject matters surrounding them. Llosa's films tend to focus on the harshness and difficulties these communities may face and for that reason, indigenous communities do not see it as complimentary. One of the reasons viewers critiqued her films, in particular The Milk of Sorrow was due to the fact that Llosa stated in her Berlinale press conference that much of the story is fiction and that such things as "the milk of sorrow" and women adopting extreme measures for rape prevention were not real.

In 2012, Claudia Llosa's short film Loxoro, produced by Oscar winner Juan José Campanella was shortlisted for the Berlin International Film Festival. Loxoro won the Teddy Award in the category of Best Short Film.

Claudia Llosa is the author of children's book La Guerrera de Cristal. This was her first work of literature and was published in 2013.

Her 2014 film Aloft had its premiere in the competition section of the 64th Berlin International Film Festival.

Claudia Llosa is also credited as director for a few episodes in TV series such as 50 años de, Fronteras, Echo 3, and Invasion.

== Filmography ==
=== Films ===
Year	Film	Director	Writer	Producer	Notes
2004	Red Envelope	No	No	Yes	Short film
2006	Madeinusa	Yes	Yes	Yes	Directorial debut
2009	The Milk of Sorrow (La teta asustada)	Yes	Yes	Yes	
2012	Loxoro	Yes	Yes	Yes	Short film
2014	Aloft	Yes	Yes	Executive	
2021	Fever Dream (Distancia de rescate)	Yes	Yes	No	
2021	Mis otros yo	Yes	No	No	Short film

=== Television series ===
Year	Film	Director	Writer	Executive producer	Notes
2009	50 años de	Yes	No	No	Directed one episode: "Tradiciones"
2010	Fronteras	Yes	Yes	No	Directed one episode: "Loxoro"
2021	Echo 3	Yes	No	No	Directed two episodes: "The Gambler" and "Upriver"
2023	Invasion	Yes	No	No	Directed one episode: "Cosmic Ocean"
2026	The Vampire Lestat	Yes	No	No	Directed two episodes: "Toronto" and "The Devil's Road"
TBA	Legacy of Spies	Yes	No	Co-executive	

== Awards and nominations ==
Year	Award	Category	Nominated work	Result
2003	Havana Film Festival	Best Unpublished Screenplay	Madeinusa	Won
2006	Sundance Film Festival	Grand Jury Prize: Dramatic	Madeinusa	Nominated
2006	International Film Festival Rotterdam	FIPRESCI Prize	Madeinusa	Won
2006	Mar del Plata International Film Festival	Best Latin American Feature Film	Madeinusa	Won
2006	Lima Latin American Film Festival	Best First Work: Second Prize	Madeinusa	Won
2006	Lima Latin American Film Festival	CONACINE Award	Madeinusa	Won
2006	Jeonju Film Festival	Woosuk Award	Madeinusa	Nominated
2006	Havana Film Festival	Grand Coral: Third Prize	Madeinusa	Won
2006	Hamburg Film Festival	Critics Award	Madeinusa	Won
2006	Cine Ceará - National Film Festival	Feature Film Trophy: Best Screenplay	Madeinusa	Won
2006	Chicago International Film Festival	Gold Hugo: New Directors Competition	Madeinusa	Nominated
2007	Cartagena Film Festival	Special Mention	Madeinusa	Won
2007	Cartagena Film Festival	Golden India Catalina: Best Film	Madeinusa	Nominated
2007	Adelaide Film Festival	International Feature Award	Madeinusa	Nominated
2009	Montréal Festival of New Cinema	Best Film	The Milk of Sorrow	Won
2009	Lima Latin American Film Festival	Best Peruvian Film	The Milk of Sorrow	Won
2009	Lima Latin American Film Festival	CONACINE Award	The Milk of Sorrow	Won
2009	Havana Film Festival	Grand Coral: First Prize	The Milk of Sorrow	Won
2009	Guadalajara International Film Festival	Mayahuel Award	The Milk of Sorrow	Won
2009	Gramado Film Festival	Golden Kikito: Best Film	The Milk of Sorrow	Won
2009	Gramado Film Festival	Golden Kikito: Best Director	The Milk of Sorrow	Won
2009	Goya Awards	Best Spanish Language Foreign Film	The Milk of Sorrow	Won
2009	Cinemanila International Film Festival	Lino Brocka Award	The Milk of Sorrow	Won
2009	Bogota Film Festival	Golden Precolumbian Circle: Best Film	The Milk of Sorrow	Won
2009	Berlin International Film Festival	Golden Berlin Bear	The Milk of Sorrow	Won
2009	Berlin International Film Festival	FIPRESCI Prize	The Milk of Sorrow	Won
2010	82nd Academy Awards	Best Foreign Film	The Milk of Sorrow	Nominated
2010	Ariel Awards	Silver Ariel: Best Latin-American Film	The Milk of Sorrow	Nominated
2010	Argentinean Film Critics Association Awards	Silver Condor	The Milk of Sorrow	Nominated
2010	Prêmio Guarani	Prêmio Guarani: Best Foreign Film	The Milk of Sorrow	Nominated
2012	Berlin International Film Festival	Teddy: Best Short Film	Loxoro	Won
2012	Berlin International Film Festival	Golden Berlin Bear	Loxoro	Nominated
2014	Málaga Spanish Film Festival	Golden Biznaga	Aloft	Nominated
2014	Berlin International Film Festival	Golden Berlin Bear	Aloft	Nominated
2017	Málaga Spanish Film Festival	Eloy de la Iglesia Award		Won
2021	San Sebastián International Film Festival	Golden Seashell	Fever Dream	Nominated
