= Amina Maher =

Artist and filmmaker (born 1992)

- امین ماهر
- Born: Amin Maher; March 5, 1992 (age 34); Tehran, Iran
- Education: University of Tehran, Limkokwing University of Creative Technology (BA), Konrad Wolf Film University of Babelsberg (MA)
- Occupations: Director, filmmaker, actress, writer, film editor
- Notable work: Letter to My Mother (2019)
- Mother: Mania Akbari

Amina Maher (Persian: امین ماهر, born 1992) is an Iranian-born queer feminist artist, activist, actress, and filmmaker living in Berlin, Germany. Her works are focused on the breakdown of family structure, shame culture, and patriarchal myths. Her creative works criticize traditions, media, culture, and norms. Her cinematic activity began as the main actor in Abbas Kiarostami and Mania Akbari's Ten (2002) nominated for the Palme d'Or at Cannes Film Festival. Since then, she acted, edited and has been in films that have been part of festivals such as Cannes Film Festival, British Film Institute, San Sebastián International Film Festival and International Film Festival Rotterdam.

Her directorial short films have been internationally well received with +200 festival participations and +50 Awards from festivals such as Ann Arbor Film Festival, TLVFest, Reeling: The Chicago LGBTQ+ International Film Festival, Expresión en Corto International Film Festival and Shorts México, among many others. Her three short films — Letter to My Mother, Out of Frame and Where Is the Friend´s Home? — have been part of the Internationales Frauen* Film Fest Dortmund+Köln and Museum Ostwall in 2022.

Her creative work explores childhood memories, mental health and self-realization with a mission to amplify trans and queer storylines. Her first directorial debüt feature has been part of Berlin International Film Festival — Dok Station Lab, Copenhagen International Documentary Film Festival — CPH:DOX Forum, and FID Lab Marseille Festival of Documentary Film.

== Biography ==
Amina Maher was born 1992, in Tehran, Iran. She started writing poems and short stories at a very early age. Her creative work is rooted in exploring interpersonal relationships, childhood memories, mental health and self-realization with a mission to amplify trans and queer storylines. Amina Maher began her cinematic activity as the main actor in Abbas Kiarostami and Mania Akbari's Ten, which recorded ten-year-old Amina sitting in the passenger seat of her mother's car without her knowledge. Maher left her family at the age of fifteen and began to live on her own.

Between 2006 and 2012, Maher continued her cinematic activity as an actor, assistant director and editor to her mother, Mania Akbari, on several films, such as 10+4 which premiered at Cannes Acid Section and San Sebastián International Film Festival in 2006, as well as From Tehran to London, premiered in 2013 at International Film Festival Rotterdam. In 2007, she started filming her friends both at school and later at university. She was arrested two days after 2009 Iranian presidential election and had been subjected to serious beatings. The reasons for her arrest were her support to Iranian Green Movement and that she had been identified as an active participant during the presidential campaign.

In 2010, she began her study at University of Tehran. Three months later, she was arrested for the second time due to her political activities and for attending the Student Day demonstration against the dictatorship. This time she spent a week in the notorious Evin prison. Maher subsequently left Iran to Dubai and then to Malaysia.

In 2016, she received her bachelor's degree in filmmaking from Limkokwing University in Malaysia. Her first student short film was Cold Wine (2012), followed by Orange and One Window Will Suffice.

Her multi-award winning short film, Letter to My Mother (2019), was well received internationally with over 200 festival selections and over 50 Awards. For four years in a row, the film has been constantly programmed among numerous arthouse-oriented film festivals. It has been part of Copenhagen International Documentary Film Festival forum as well as the competitions at numerous international film festivals, such as 36th Kasseler Dokfest, 38th Feminale - The International Dortmund | Cologne Women's Film Festival, the 15th Shorts México and the 26th Chéries-Chéris (Festival du Film Lesbian, Gay, Bi, Trans & ++++ de Paris). The film is about her own experiences of childhood sexual abuse.

The film was described in reviews variously as avant-garde, poignant and moving. It navigates the space between self-exploration and family politics within a sociocultural framework.

Letter to My Mother received awards such as the Audience Award and the Special Jury Prize at the 23rd Indie Memphis Film Festival, USA and Special Jury price at the 15th Shorts México and the Beirut International Women Film Festival.

Due to directing controversial films, Maher fled to Germany in 2018. After moving to Berlin in 2019, she started her MA degree study in film directing at Konrad Wolf Film University of Babelsberg.

Maher is also a genderqueer feminist activist. Her activism is about body politics & transgender rights concerning the experiences of marginalization, sexual abuse, sexuality, dictatorship and oppressive systems, decolonizing the body and gender. She encourages herself and her environment to embrace vulnerability and reclaim bodies, care and pleasure.

== Letter to My Mother (2019) ==
The film Letter to My Mother (2019) was self-produced, directed, written, performed, and distributed. It has evoked wider social debate, highlighting the need and benefit of sexual assault survivors and communities being able to speak openly about their own experiences of sexual assault and harassment.

Letter to My Mother won numerous awards and nominations and had been part of the program of more than 100 international film festivals in more than 40 countries. 35th Lovers Film Festival - Torino LGBTQI Visions, 34th Mix Milano Film Festival in Italy, the 9th Evolution Mallorca International Film Festival in Spain, and the 27th Blue Sea Film Festival in Finland are some of the festivals in which the film was programmed or was nominated for the main award

=== Other selections and participations ===
- 10th Sicilia Queer filmfest, Italy
- 15th Queer Xposed Film Festival, Berlin-Germany
- Broadway Cinematheque, Hong Kong Asian Film Festival, Hong Kong
- 12th KASHISH Mumbai International Queer Film Festival, India
- 15th Scottish Mental Health Arts Festival, SMHAF, Scotland - Winner of the Best Experimental Film
- 9th Evolution Mallorca International Film Festival, Spain (2015)
- Chennai International Queer Film Festival

== Reviews ==
Essays on the political body at 22nd Belo Horizonte International Film Festival, Brazil: "In Letter to my Mother, Amina Maher conceives a complex montage assembling autobiographical report, epistolary language, archives, and performance. The filmmaker goes through archives of her own therapy sessions and images from the movie, Ten (2002), in which she participated when she was a child, in search of the creation of an autonomous body, one not defined by abuse. One that is free from restraint".

The jury statement at 15th SMHAF: "This is more than just a film. It is an act of courage and radical honesty. It pushes the boundaries in its cinematic discourse on violence, identity, gender, and sexuality; whilst maintaining an unflinching intimacy as the filmmaker shares a long-held secret with her mother and searches for ways of coping and moving forward."

Dutch Culture: "Within the multifarious strands of filmmaking practice, Maher's filmmaking uses trauma therapy as a theme and it is characterized by a few key factors: its an autoethnographic approach, a desire for honest self-examination, and a play with notions of cinema, reality and life. As the direct victim of abuse, she gave an insight into an experience that is impossible to imagine.

== #MeToo movement in Iran and Interview with Iran International ==
On 25 August 2019, the Persian TV channel, Iran International interviewed Maher, where she came forward publicly that a family member had raped her over a four-year period. With this interview, she had also her coming out as a trans woman in Persian-speaking media, which was followed by a large number of insults, transphobic comments and attacks on social media. Maher had rarely been seen on mainstream Persian-speaking TV before.

== Life and other activities ==
When Maher was a child, her real-life relationship with her mother, Mania Akbari, was featured in the movie Ten. Four years after that, Maher performed the main role in Mania Akbari's 10+4, a continuation of the movie Ten, which followed Akbari's battle with breast cancer. 10+4 screened at Cannes International Film Festival and San Sebastián International Film Festival amongst many other festivals and received critical praise. Afterwards, Maher followed her film activities as an actress, editor and assistant director to her mother on 6 Video Arts and From Tehran to London.

In 2010, Maher began studying at Tehran University. Two months later she was arrested due to her political activities and for attending a Student Day demonstration. She subsequently left Iran to study filmmaking at Limkokwing University in Malaysia and directed several short films. Her first fictional short film, Sweet Gin and Cold Wine, was nominated for the best short film award at the 21st Oldenburg International Film Festival in Germany and won an award of recognition at the Creative Open International Film Festival (IOFF) in 2016.

In November 2019, Maher finished her documentary film Letter to My Mother, which stems from her own experience of childhood sexual abuse. The film opens up a cinematic discourse about anger, repression, violence and identity. Letter to My Mother was described as a fearless and strong examination that chooses a radically intimate perspective. It is an examination that touches upon the center of the pain and dares to look precisely. It finds exact scenes for despair and cruelty and searches openly for ways of coping.

== Artworks ==
=== As actress ===
- Ten (2002, as herself the protagonist)
- Repression (2004) (video art)
- Escape (2004) (video art)
- 10 + 4 (2007)
- Sweet Gin and Cold Wine (2014)
- Orange (2015)
- Letter to My Mother (2019, as herself)
- Out of Frame (Production Year: 2015, completion year: 2021, release year: 2022)
- Where Is The Friend´s Home? (completion year: 2020, release year: 2023, as herself)

=== As director ===
- Sweet Gin and Cold Wine (2014)
- Orange (2015)
- Letter to My Mother (2019)
- Out of Frame (production year: 2015, completion year: 2021, release year: 2022)
- Where Is The Friend´s Home? (completion year: 2020, release year: 2023)

=== As editor ===
- Letter to My Mother (2019)
- Out of Frame (production year: 2015, completion year:2021, release year: 2022)
- Where Is The Friend´s Home? (completion year: 2020, release year: 2023)

=== Book ===
- Start counting from eleven (poem, 2013)
