= Bijan Daneshmand =

Iranian born-British actor (born 1958)

- بیژن دانشمند
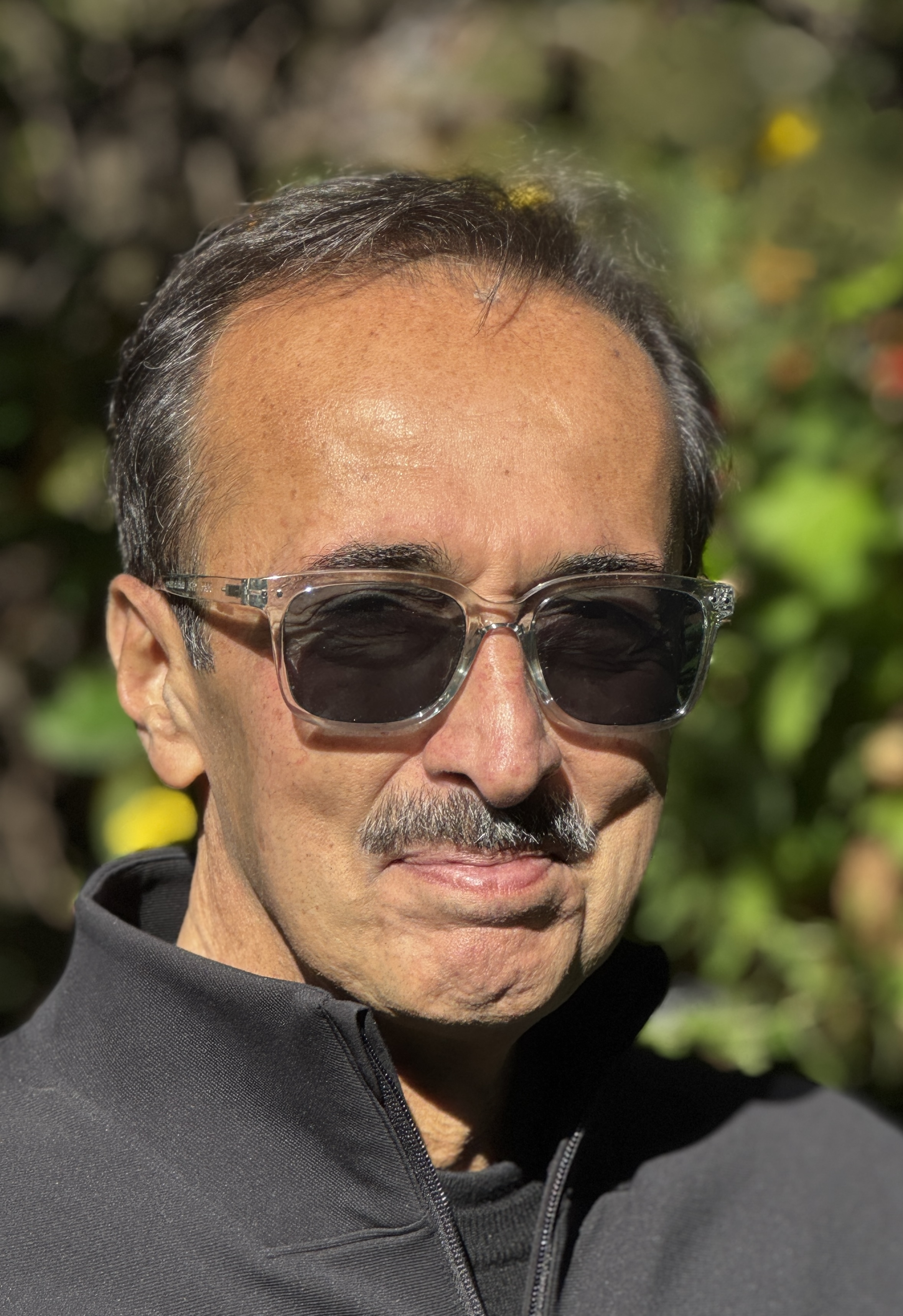
- Daneshmand in 2025
- Born: 16 August 1958 (age 68); Tehran, Imperial State of Iran
- Education: King's College London; Eastbourne College; London Centre For Theatre Studies; Philippe Gaulier School, Paris; Chelsea College of Arts
- Occupations: Actor, artist
- Website: bijandaneshmand.com

Bijan Daneshmand (Persian: بیژن دانشمند, born 16 August 1958) is an Iranian actor and artist based in London, England. He is known for producing and starring in 20 Fingers (2004), which won the Best Digital Film award at the 61st Venice International Film Festival; for his roles in Shirin Neshat's Women Without Men (2009) and Babak Anvari's Under the Shadow (2016); as the character Kouyami in The Night Manager (2016), directed by Susanne Bier; and for portraying Ali Reza Jamshidpour in Maryam Keshavarz's The Persian Version (2023) and Rasoul Shahin in the Netflix series The Diplomat.

== Early life and education ==
Bijan Daneshmand was born on 16 August 1958 in Tehran, Iran. At the age of 10, he moved to England to receive his early education.

After graduating from King's College London, he attended the London Centre for Theatre Studies and the Philippe Gaulier School in Paris to develop his acting skills. Later, he obtained an MA from Chelsea College of Arts.

== Career ==
=== Early career ===
In 1996, Daneshmand founded The Leonard, a boutique hotel near Marble Arch in central London, which became a favoured base for musicians and film professionals. William Orbit made recordings there for projects associated with Madonna, U2 and Pink. In 2003, Daneshmand sold his family interest in the business, to focus entirely on his art and acting.

=== Film and television ===
In 2004, Daneshmand produced and acted in 20 Fingers, a feature film, directed by and co-starring Mania Akbari. Filmed by Touraj Aslani with a digital video camera, the film consists of seven long takes in which Daneshmand and Akbari portray a couple, who discuss and argue about their relationship. It addresses subjects such as abortion, infidelity, and divorce. The film premiered at the 61st Venice International Film Festival, where it won the Best Digital Film, Venezia Digitale.

In 2006, Daneshmand wrote and directed the avant-garde film, A Snake's Tail. It was named Best International Feature at the Bare Bones International Film Festival in Oklahoma and was screened at the Festival Do Rio and the Frankfurt International Film Festival.

In 2009, Daneshmand appeared in Women Without Men, which was directed by Shirin Neshat and Shoja Azari. It is based on the 1990 novel by Shahrnush Parsipur. The film addresses gender and political issues in Iran and received the Silver Lion for Best Director at the 2009 Venice Film Festival.

In 2011, Daneshmand portrayed a teacher in Two & Two, which was directed by Babak Anvari, co-produced by Kit Fraser, and written by Babak Anvari and Gavin Cullen. The eight-minute film follows a teacher who instructs his pupils that two plus two equals five. It was nominated for the British Academy of Film and Television Arts (BAFTA) Award for Best Short Film in 2012.

In 2016, Daneshmand played the role of university director in Under the Shadow, a Persian-language psychological horror film directed by Babak Anvari. Set in Tehran during the Iran–Iraq War, the film follows a mother and daughter experiencing supernatural events. It premiered at the 2016 Sundance Film Festival and received the BAFTA Award for Outstanding Debut by a British Writer, Director or Producer in 2017.

In 2021, Daneshmand wrote and directed the Persian-language web series, The Bahramis.

In 2022, Daneshmand was cast as a AliReza Jamshidpour, one of the principal characters in Maryam Keshavarz's film The Persian Version. The film premiered in the U.S. Dramatic Competition at the 2023 Sundance Film Festival in January 2023, where it won the Waldo Salt Screenwriting Award and the Audience Award.

In 2025, Daneshmand portrayed Baba, the father of Nazanin Zaghari-Ratcliffe, in the four-part BBC One factual drama Prisoner 951. The series received awards from the British Academy of Film and Television Arts and the Royal Television Society.

=== Radio ===
Daneshmand has appeared regularly in BBC Radio productions, including Baghdad Burning (2010), the Radio 4 drama The Boy from Aleppo Who Painted the War (2014), The Price of Oil: The Weapon (2015), B7 Media's Dan Dare audio drama (2017), the BBC World Service documentary drama Fall of the Shah (2019), and Central Intelligence (2024).

=== Art ===
Alongside his acting career, Daneshmand works as a painter of geometric abstraction, with a focus on repetition, non-periodic tiling and patterns derived from Persian architecture. His work has been shown in solo and group exhibitions in London, Tehran, Los Angeles, and Beijing, including Kids of Dada (2014), Unreadable at the Pangea Sculptors' Centre (2015), Blue Gold at Etemad Gallery in Tehran (2016) and the solo exhibition Infinite Truths at Janet Rady Fine Art in London (2017). In 2020, he began Damavand, a series of more than 150 paintings inspired by Mount Damavand and its associations with childhood memory and Iranian identity.

=== Voice acting ===
In 2024, Daneshmand performed as the voice character of King Darius, in Prince of Persia: The Lost Crown video game by Ubisoft.

=== Theatre ===
In 2026, Daneshmand made his major London stage debut at the Almeida Theatre in the world premiere of Carmen Nasr's adaptation of Under the Shadow, directed by Nadia Latif. He played Mr Bijari and the university director, reimagining the film role he had originated a decade earlier.

== Selected filmography ==
=== Film ===
List of film appearances, with year, title, and role shown
Year	Title	Role	Reference(s)
2004	20 Fingers	The Husband, The Man	
2005	Munich	Kamal Nasser	
2006	A Snake's Tail	Bijan, Kami, and Agha	
2008	Body of Lies	Amman Clinic Doctor	
2009	Women Without Men	Abbas	
2010	Green Zone	Zubaidi's Aide	
2012	From Tehran to London	Ashkan	
2016	Under the Shadow	Director	
2020	Pari	Director- Ahmadi	
2020	Infidel	Dr. Hossein Tehrani	
2021	Mister Mayfair	Ali	
2023	The Persian Version	Ali Reza	
2025	100 Nights of Hero	Jerome's Father	

=== Television ===
List of television appearances, with year, title, and role shown
Year	Title	Role	Reference(s)
2005	Casualty	Dr. Hamid Guyrat	
2005	Spooks (US title: MI5)	Bashir Shalhoob	
2007	Saddam's Tribe	Journalist	
2008	Special Forces Heroes	Salim	
2009	The Omid Djalili Show	Appearance	
2011	Page Eight	Cambridge Don	
2015	Suspects	Jamal Khan	
2016	The Night Manager	Kouyami	
2017	Modus	Mahmoud Muntasir	
2018	The Looming Tower	Farouq Osman	
2018	Deep State	Ali Ardavan	
2019	Follow the Money	Abbas	
2019	Traitors	Abu Selim	
2020	EastEnders	Dr Jamil	
2022	Suspicion	Masoud Ghorbani	
2022	Tehran	Dr. Kourosh Zamestani	
2022	House of the Dragon	The Priest	
2023	The Diplomat	Rasoul Shahin	
2024	Brassic	Mr. Calvo	
2024	Coronation Street	Mr Akram	
2025	Prisoner 951	Baba	

=== Radio ===
List of radio appearances, with year and radio station shown
Title	Year	Radio station
Westway	2004-6	BBC World Service
April's Fool	2009	BBC World Service
The Fence	2009	BBC World Service
Spit	2009	BBC World Service
The Interview	2009	BBC Radio 4
Baghdad Burning	2009	BBC Radio 4
Amazing Grace	2010	BBC Radio 4
The Boy from Aleppo that Painted the War	2015	BBC Radio 4
The Weapon	2015	BBC Radio 4
Dan Dare	2017	B7 Media
Fall of the Shah	2019	BBC World Service drama
Central Intelligence	2024	BBC Radio 4

=== Theatre ===
List of theatre appearances, with year, title, role, and venue shown
Year	Title	Role	Venue	Notes	Reference(s)
2026	Under the Shadow	Mr Bijari - Director	Almeida Theatre	World-premiere stage adaptation of Babak Anvari's feature film Under the Shadow	

== Awards and recognition ==
- 2004: Best Film Venezia Cinema Digitale at the Venice Film Festival, for 20 Fingers, produced by Daneshmand
- 2006: Winner, Best International Feature at the Bare Bones International Film Festival, for A Snake's Tail, written and directed by Daneshmand
- 2021: Award of Merit in the Web Series category and Award of Excellence in the Actor: Leading category at the IndieFEST Film Awards, for The Bahramis.
- 2021: Best Actor at the Buenos Aires International Film Festival for The Bahramis.
