= Ten (2002 film) =

- Directed by: Abbas Kiarostami (Note: The film's credits have been disputed by Akbari; see § Production.)
- Produced by: Marin Karmitz; Abbas Kiarostami
- Starring: Mania Akbari; Amina Maher (Note: Credited as Amin Maher; Maher is transgender and changed her name in 2019.)
- Cinematography: Abbas Kiarostami
- Edited by: Abbas Kiarostami; Vahid Ghazi; Bahman Kiarostami
- Music by: Howard Blake
- Release date: May 20, 2002 (Cannes Film Festival)
- Running time: 94 minutes
- Country: Iran
- Language: Persian

Ten (Persian: ده, romanized: Dah; appears as 10 during the opening credits) is a 2002 Iranian docufiction film starring Mania Akbari and Amina Maher. It was released with Abbas Kiarostami credited as the director; however, his role in the film and the source of the footage have been disputed by Akbari since 2020.

The film premiered May 20, 2002 at the 55th Cannes Film Festival, where it was nominated for the Palme d'Or. It received positive reviews from film critics. Due to its discussion of discrimination against women, Ten was banned in Iran. The film's two lead actresses have made calls for the distributor to stop screening it, over allegations of plagiarism and abuse by Kiarostami.

== Plot ==
The film is divided into ten scenes, each of which depict a conversation between an unchanging female driver (played by Mania Akbari) and a variety of passengers as she drives around Tehran. Her passengers include her young son Amin (played by Akbari's real life child, Amina Maher), her sister, a bride, a sex worker, and a woman on her way to prayer.

The first vignette of the film is a conversation between Amin and his mother, as he is being driven to the local pool. Over the course of their conversation, the driver raises her voice to him and tensions escalate as he yells over her. It is revealed that, due to the limited rights women are given the court system, the driver obtained a divorce from her ex-husband, by falsely telling the court he was a drug addict. After their conversation erupts into a fight, Amin abruptly exits the car.

The second vignette features the driver's sister who works as a teacher. They discuss the heavy burden and expectations children place on their parents. Both of their children have accused the women of not being good mothers. They eventually pick up a birthday cake for the driver's husband, Mortaza. The driver's sister advises her regarding Amin's rude behavior and tells her to let Amin live with his father, who will be able to "set him straight".

During the third vignette, the driver picks up a pious old woman who goes to the Mausoleum three times a day to pray. She reveals that her husband and 12-year-old son have both died. She goes to the Mausoleum to pray for them. She has sold her possessions in order to go on a pilgrimage to Syria and has given away her other possessions to people who are less fortunate than her. Their conversation ends as the driver drops the old woman off at the Mausoleum after she is unable to convince the driver to go in and pray herself.

The fourth vignette starts with a sex worker who mistakes the driver for a male client and gets into her car. The driver continues to drive around with the unnamed woman and persists in asking her personal questions. The sex worker, in turn, ends up lecturing the driver. She tells the driver that many of her clients are married men that get calls from their wives while they are with her. She admits to the driver that she feels bad for women who are idiotic enough to cling onto men and who actually believe that men are truthful. The sex worker was engaged to a man once until she realized she was "foolish". The conversation ends as she is dropped off and immediately picked up by a client.

The fifth vignette features a woman whose relation to the driver is unclear. The woman is picked up just after she has prayed at the Mausoleum. The two women discuss religion and whether or not they are believers. The passenger confesses that she had not been a believer in the past, and now she is not so sure. The passenger tells the driver that she was supposed to get married and she now prays at the Mausoleum with the hope that the man she is dating will propose soon.

In the next vignette, the driver picks up Amin from her ex-husband, who has been taking care of him. She and her ex-husband each stay in their cars, leaving Amin to cross a busy traffic-filled street. The driver asks permission to keep Amin overnight and he eventually agrees. Amin disagrees with his mother over a shortcut to his grandmother's house, but eventually realizes his mother is going the right way. Amin tells his mom that his father has been watching porn at home alone at night.

The driver next picks up her crying sister who is distraught over her husband leaving after 7 years together. As she cries, the driver tells her: "It is wrong to cling to him". The driver is reciting almost exactly what the sex worker had told her the night before. The driver is very frank and harsh with her sister. She tells her to toughen up and stop being so weak.

During the eighth vignette, the driver is with Amin again. She says a woman told her that Amin is a man and therefore needs to live and learn from a man. The driver agrees that Amin should go live with his father, and they have a conversation about her ex-husband finding a new wife. Amin says that his new wife would be better than his mother by obeying her husband, doing more housework, and coming home earlier. They disagree again over a shortcut and soon their argument escalates to the point where Amin abruptly gets out of the car again.

The ninth vignette features the same woman from the fifth vignette. She tells the driver that her boyfriend does not want to marry her, despite her hopes that he will. She feels jealous over the fact that he is thinking of another woman and that is what hurts her the most. The driver asks her passenger why her veil is so tight, and it is revealed that the passenger has shaved her head.

The final vignette is the shortest. The driver picks up Amin from his father. The film ends as the driver is taking him to his grandma's house.

== Cast ==
- Mania Akbari as Driver
- Amina Maher as Amin
- Kamran Adl
- Roya Akbari as Prostitute + Lover (as Roya Arabshahi)
- Roya Arabshahi
- Amene Moradi
- Mandana Sharbaf
- Katayoun Taleizadeh

== Production ==
Kiarostami has characterized Ten as a fiction film, an account disputed by Akbari since 2020. According to Kiarostami, the scenarios were originally written as psychologist conducting sessions out of her car while her office is being renovated. This premise was altered after it was deemed unworkable. He stated in one interview that he used an earpiece under Akbari's veil to guide her in the conversations. He later explained that he only tried this technique once and found it unsuitable.

In August 2020, Akbari accused Kiarostami of plagiarism, stating that Ten consisted of footage shot by her. According to Akbari, she recorded 120 hours of video for a personal project. Akbari was not planning to use the content for a film, and she stated that "none of the women involved in the film ever received a single cent for their participation in 10". Kiarostami told her he was interested in developing it into a script. Kiarostami shot three parts of the film: one with Kamran Adl as the boy's father and two where the sex worker and the religious woman exit the car. He shot additional footage that was not included in the film. He ultimately acted as editor on Ten, using Akbari's original footage, and showed her a final cut without any credits. Kiarostami later recreated behind-the-scenes content after Ten's premiere.

Adl confirmed that Kiarostami invited him to be in the film and shot his scenes. He responded that he believed Akbari's claims to be frivolous. Amina Maher created the 2019 short film Letter to My Mother, in which she said that her scenes from Ten were filmed without her knowledge. The end credits for Ten list the cast and crew's names without specifying their role on the film.

== Release ==
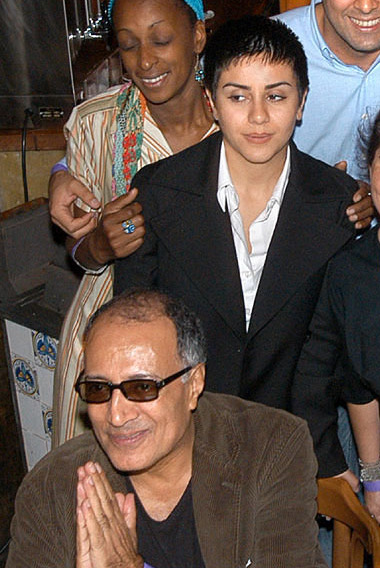
Akbari (right) and Kiarostami (bottom) in 2004

Ten premiered on May 20, 2002, at the 55th Cannes Film Festival. Akbari went with Kiarostami to the premiere and later two additional screenings at the Institute of Contemporary Arts and the Thessaloniki International Film Festival. Because of her damaged relationship with Kiarostami, she stepped away from the press campaign after this. The film was banned in Iran because of four sequences that were deemed unsuitable for public viewing, particularly around discussions of gender discrimination.

Akbari and Maher asked distributor MK2 to halt circulation of the film but did not receive a response. When the British Film Institute scheduled Ten as part of a retrospective on Kiarostami's work, Akbari publicly shared their letters, which included allegations of plagiarism and abuse by Kiarostami. The BFI cancelled its screening, and Akbari said in an interview that she wants "to stop public screenings of 10".

== Reception and legacy ==
The film received a positive response from contemporary film critics. On the review aggregator website Rotten Tomatoes, 85% of 53 critics' reviews are positive, with an average rating of 7.30/10. The website's consensus reads: "Ten turns a conversational car ride into a gritty and compelling character study full of real emotion while providing an intriguing look into the lives of women in contemporary Iranian culture."

For The New York Times, A. O. Scott wrote that "Kiarostami understands the automobile as a place for reflection, observation and, above all, talk". In a review for the Los Angeles Times, Manohla Dargis called the film a "conceptual tour de force and a brainiac's road movie". Roger Ebert was critical of how Ten presented its themes, writing that "to praise the film for this is like praising a child for coloring between the lines". J. Hoberman of The Village Voice described the film as "conceptually rigorous, splendidly economical, and radically Bazinian".

Ten ranked at 447th place on Empire magazine's 2008 list of the 500 greatest movies of all time and 47th in "The 100 Best Films Of World Cinema" list in 2010. The French film magazine Cahiers du cinéma ranked the film tenth in its list of best films of 2000–2009. The film was later voted the 98th greatest film since 2000 in an international critics' poll conducted by the BBC.

In 2019, The Guardian ranked Ten 76th in its 100 Best Films of the 21st Century list.

Kiarostami and Akbari each produced follow-ups to the film. Kiarostami's 2004 10 on Ten is a ten-part exploration of the process of making Ten. Akbari's 2007 10+4, made while Akbari was being treated for breast cancer, serves as a sequel to Ten. Ten was also a major influence on Jafar Panahi's 2015 film Taxi.
