= En tus brazos =

- Directed by: Fx Goby; Matthieu Landour; Edouard Jouret
- Written by: Fx Goby; Matthieu Landour; Edouard Jouret
- Produced by: Supinfocom
- Starring: Fx Goby; Aida Del Solar
- Music by: Los Autenticos Reyes Del Tango
- Release date: 2006
- Running time: 5 minutes
- Country: France
- Language: Spanish

En Tus Brazos is a 2006 French animated short film directed by Fx Goby, Matthieu Landour and Edouard Jouret. The film inspired by Tango culture has been shown in many festivals around the world and won a few awards including the SIGGRAPH Award of Excellence in 2007. The film has also been shown in festivals such as Annecy International Animated Film Festival, and the Clermont-Ferrand International Short Film Festival.

En Tus Brazos is a graduation film from Supinfocom 2006.

== Plot ==
A tango dancer considered to be the greatest of the 1920s is stuck in a wheelchair after an accident. Thanks to his wife, he recovers the use of his legs, the time of one imaginary dance.

== Awards ==
- "Award of Excellence", SIGGRAPH 2007
