= Sabrina Jean =

Activist for people of Chagos Islands in the Indian Ocean

- Born: Sabrina Aristide; 1973; Mauritius
- Occupations: Social Activist, Facilities Assistant for NHS

Sabrina Jean (born 1973) is a second-generation Chagossian and activist for the Chagossian community to return home to the Chagos Islands in the Indian Ocean, administered as part of the British Indian Ocean Territory.

== Background ==
Sabrina Jean was born in Mauritius, the daughter of Serge Aristide, who was born on the atoll of Peros Banhos in 1950 but left for Mauritius in 1967 when his mother was unwell. When Aristide tried to return to Peros Banhos in the late 1960s and early 1970s he was told that his home had been given to the UK. Jean's father, Serge Aristide, was among the 1,500-plus people forced to leave the British overseas territory when it was leased to the US to build a military base in Diego Garcia. They were taken in boats to Mauritius and the Seychelles without relocation assistance, and most lived in poverty. Jean moved from Mauritius to the town of Crawley in the UK in 2006. Crawley is home to around 3,000 second-generation Chagossians, Britain's largest Chagossian population.

== Activism ==
In Mauritius Jean joined a youth group of Chagossians led by Olivier Bancoult, which brought a sense of community and awareness to the second and third generation Chagossians born in Mauritius. On relocating to Crawley in 2006, Jean became chairperson of the Chagos Refugee Group In 2011 she was allowed by the UK government to visit her home island of Peros Banhos, part of the Chagos Islands for the first and only time, visiting the homeland of her father. Speaking of the atoll, Jean said “There is nothing, just structures of houses and of the church. There is nothing inside. Nothing. It's deserted. It was heartbreaking to see it with my own eyes.”

In 2013 Jean helped found the Chagos Football Association and is its current chairperson.

== Another Paradise ==
A documentary film by Belgian film director Olivier Magis that chronicles the plight of the Chagossian community in Crawley, Another Paradise, was released in 2019 and features Jean throughout.
