= Shorts México =

Film festival

The Mexico International Short Film Festival - Shorts México - is a film festival exclusively dedicated to short films in Mexico.

Since 2006, it has been held annually during the first week of September in Mexico City, in addition to having a national and international Tour, which takes Mexican short films to venues in Mexico City, other cities in the country and in the world.

It is a festival certified by the Mexican Academy of Cinematographic Arts and Sciences (AMACC). This means that by submitting a short film at this festival, one can register and be considered for the Ariel Award.

The 15th edition of Shorts México (FICMEX) will take place from September 2 to 9, 2020.

The Festival's founder and director is Jorge Magaña and the Director of programming is film curator and producer, Isaac Basulto.

== Evolution ==
Founded by Jorge Magaña, the first edition took place in 2006 under the name of Shorts Shorts Film Festival Mexico. It was the adaptation of an Asian format, which continues to take place in the city of Tokyo. It was supported by institutions such as the Embassy of Japan in Mexico, Japan Foundation, the Mexican Institute of Cinematography (IMCINE), Cinemex, Televisa Foundation and Telmex Foundation. The venues were: Cinemex WTC, Cinemex Insurgentes, Bella Epoca Cine Lido Cultural Center, Cinematoía Loreto, Pabellón de Alta Tecnología (PAT), the Cineteca Nacional and the University Cultural Center of the UNAM.

As of 2011, the special program of Homenage en Corto was created, in which the works of some actors realized in short films are presented. In that edition, the first actress commemorated was Ana Ofelia Murguía; in 2012, Damián Alcázar; in 2013, Daniel Giménez Cacho; in 2015, the actress Cecilia Suárez; in 2016, Mónica Huarte; in 2017, Vanessa Bauche and in 2018, Arcelia Ramírez. Likewise, in 2013, the Neo Mex Mexican Competition was created to promote new talents in Mexican cinema.

In 2012, it was decided to continue with the Short Film Screenplay Contest, in which the participants submit short film screenplays.

In 2019, the Short Film Pitching Competition was created, in which participants submit short film projects.

== Other events of the festival ==
=== Noches de Shorts ===
Created in 2014 with the purpose of having a place of continuous exhibition for the short film, they are also known as "Noche de Cortoteca". It is an exhibition platform that has the presence of filmmakers, directors, producers, actors, who interact with the audience. They show mainly Mexican short films and a specialized selection of international shorts. This event takes place at the Cineteca Nacional, Fondo de Cultura Económica - Bella Epoca Cine Lido Cultural Center, and now the Comunal Condesa restaurant.

=== Cortoteca ===
Web program dedicated exclusively to diffuse the national and international short films produced by Shorts México and the company Filmmen, presented by the actress Mónica Huarte.

=== Espacio Shorts México ===
Created in 2017, it is the first program dedicated to a film festival, presented by Mexican actress Vanessa Bauche and directed by Rafa Lara, aired on AZ Cinema. The purpose of the program is to show the winning short films of each edition of the festival.

=== Shorts México Academy ===
Series of conferences created and carried out on an academic level with professionals in the fields related to production, postproduction, screenplay, promotion, copyright, etc.

=== Tour Shorts México ===
At the end of its exhibition in Mexico City the festival has a Shorts México Tour throughout the year, which takes place in Mexico City, cities and towns of the Mexican Republic, as well as in various countries. At the national level it has been presented in: Zacatecas, León, Morelia, Fresnillo, Xalapa, Los Cabos, Mérida, Querétaro, Monterrey, Cancun, Oaxaca, Puebla and Saltillo. Internationally, a selection of Mexican shorts have been presented in Tokyo, New York, Cairo, London, Paris, Madrid, Montreal, Santiago and Vancouver.

== Awards ==
Editions	Competitions	Awards	Winners
2006	MEXICAN CINEMA	Best Mexican short film	La leche y el agua by Celso García
2006	MEXICAN CINEMA	Best director	Francisco Vargas Quevedo for El violín
2006	MEXICAN CINEMA	Best screenplay	Celso García for La leche y el agua
2006	MEXICAN CINEMA	Best photography	Ciro Cabello for El Otro Cuarto
2006	MEXICAN CINEMA	Best actress	Vicky de Fuentes for Latidos
2006	MEXICAN CINEMA	Best actor	Dagoberto Gama for El violín
2006	MEXICAN CINEMA	Special mention	Música de ambulancia by Paula Marcovitch
2006	MEXICAN VIDEO	Best Mexican short film in video	En el cielo como en la tierra by Natalia López
2006	IBEROAMERICAN	Best iberoamerican short film	Te quiero mal by Mireia Giró Costa from Spain
2006	IBEROAMERICAN	Special mention	Medianeras by Gustavo Taretto from Argentina
2007	MEXICAN CINEMA	Best Mexican short film	Tiene la tarde ojos by Hari-Carlos Sama
2007	MEXICAN CINEMA	Best Director	Pablo Fulgueira for Es muy fácil
2007	MEXICAN CINEMA	Best screenplay	Sebastián Menagaz y Lucas Ezequiel Damino for Reality Show
2007	MEXICAN CINEMA	Best photography	Ciro Cabello for Fin de trayecto
2007	MEXICAN CINEMA	Best Actor	Enrique Arreola for Tiene la tarde ojos
2007	MEXICAN CINEMA	Best actress	Ana Ofelia Murguía for Señas particulares
2007	MEXICAN CINEMA	Special mention of the jury	De la vista nace el amor by Miguel Anaya, Ver Llover by Elisa Miller, El sueño de Isi by Isi Sarfati
2007	MEXICAN VIDEO	Best Mexican short film in video	De causas y azares by Ileana Leyva
2007	MEXICAN VIDEO	Special mention of the jury	Ventana by Santiago Esteinou, Historia de un letrero by Alonso Álvarez
2007	MEXICAN VIDEO	Special mention for photography	Lugares secretos by Alejandro Díaz
2007	IBEROAMERICAN	Best iberoamerican short film	Éramos pocos by Borja Cobeaga
2007	IBEROAMERICAN	Special mention of the jury	El canto del grillo by Dany Campos
2008	MEXICAN CINEMA	Best short film	Café paraíso by Alonso Ruizpalacios
2008	MEXICAN CINEMA	Best Director	Alonso Ruizpalacios for Café paraíso
2008	MEXICAN CINEMA	Best photography	Damián García for Café paraíso
2008	MEXICAN CINEMA	Best screenplay	Alonso Ruizpalacios for Café paraíso
2008	MEXICAN CINEMA	Best actor	Tenoch Huerta for Café paraíso
2008	MEXICAN CINEMA	Best actress	Yuriria del Valle for La ropa sucia
2008	MEXICAN CINEMA	Special mention of the jury	Cosita linda by Fernando Fidel Urdapilleta
2008	MEXICAN CINEMA	Special mention of the jury	¡Destápalo! by Eun Hee Ihm
2008	MEXICAN CINEMA	Special mention of the jury	Jacinta by Karla Castañeda
2008	MEXICAN CINEMA	Special mention of the jury	La curiosa conquista del ampere by Ramón Orozco
2008	MEXICAN VIDEO	Best short film	Edén, by Sergio Tovar Velarde
2008	MEXICAN VIDEO	Best director	Gabriel Herrera for Primer movimiento para veinte hombres en un cuarto vacío
2008	MEXICAN VIDEO	Special mention for animation	El hambre de Caribdis by Chehaibar-Macias
2008	MEXICAN VIDEO	Special mention for experimental	Pescador by Daniela Schneider
2008	MEXICAN VIDEO	Technical special mention	Cero en geometría by Isac Betancourt
2008	MEXICAN VIDEO	Technical special mention	El llanto de la tierra by Lucio Olmos
2008	IBEROAMERICAN	Best short film	Saliva by Esmir Filho (Brazil)
2008	IBEROAMERICAN	Best director	Eduardo Chapero Jackson for the short film Alumbramiento (Spain)
2008	IBEROAMERICAN	Special mention of the jury	Convite para jantar com o camarada Stalin by Ricardo Alves (Brazil-Argentina)
2008	IBEROAMERICAN	Award SIGNIS	Paloma by Roberto Fiesco
2008	IBEROAMERICAN	Special mention SIGNIS	Carretera del Norte by Rubén Rojo Aura
2008		Award Cinemex	Voodoo Bayou by Javier Gutiérrez
2008	Award CINEMAFILMS	Best short film cinema	Café paraíso by Alonso Ruizpalaciocena
2008	Award CINEMAFILMS	Best short film video	Edén, by Sergio Tovar Velarde
2009	MEXICAN CINEMA	Best short	Tierra y Pan, by Carlos Armella
2009	MEXICAN CINEMA	Best Director	Carlos Armella for Tierra y Pan
2009	MEXICAN CINEMA	Best screenplay	40 grados a la Sombra, by Flavio González Mello
2009	MEXICAN CINEMA	Best photography	40 grados a la Sombra, by César Gutiérrez and Iván Fernández
2009	MEXICAN CINEMA	Best edition	El armadillo fronterizo, by Miguel Anaya Borja
2009	MEXICAN CINEMA	Best sound	Carlos Zamorano for Tierra y pan
2009	MEXICAN CINEMA	Best Actor	Rubén Pablos for La canción de los niños muertos
2009	MEXICAN CINEMA	Best actress	Ana Elisa Fernández for Sobre ruedas
2009	MEXICAN CINEMA	Special mention	Jaulas, by Juan José Medina
2009	MEXICAN CINEMA	Special mention	Sobre Ruedas, by Ivonne Delgadillo
2009	MEXICAN CINEMA	Special mention (Carlos Bonfil)	La cena, by Gil González
2009	MEXICAN CINEMA	Special mention (Mónica Huarte)	La espera, by Pablo Tamez
2009	MEXICAN VIDEO	Best short	Fogatas en el cielo, by César Salgado
2009	MEXICAN VIDEO	Best animated short	El Gran Bang, by the collective Llamarada de Petate
2009	MEXICAN VIDEO	Special mention of the jury	Pelea de gallos, by Gabriel Pontones
2009	MEXICAN VIDEO	Special mention of the jury	Pájaros en abril, by Gabriel Ridaura
2009	MEXICAN VIDEO	Special mention of the jury	El descubrimiento, by Alonso Álvarez Barreda
2009	MEXICAN VIDEO	Special mention of the jury	Nación Apache, by Carlos Muñoz
2009	MEXICAN VIDEO	Special mention of the jury	Día Festivo, by Eber García
2009	IBEROAMERICAN	Best short	Donde quiera que vayas, by Sara Barbas from Portugal/UK
2009	IBEROAMERICAN	Best director	Brian Jacobs for Quien es el Verdugo, from Cuba/Perú
2009	IBEROAMERICAN	Best screenplay	El ataque de los robots de la nebulosa-5, by Chema García Ibarra from Spain
2009	IBEROAMERICAN	Best photography	Javier Fuentes for El mal de Schneider, by Javier Chillón from Spain
2009	IBEROAMERICAN	Best acting	Mónica Muntaner in Absent, by Guillermo Asensio from Spain
2009	IBEROAMERICAN	Best sound	Carlos Manrique Clavijo, Gonzalo García for En Agosto; Andrés Barrientos and Carlos Andrés Reyes from Colombia
2009	IBEROAMERICAN	Best edition	Enterrados by Alex Lora Cércos, from Spain
2009	SIGNIS	Award SIGNIS	La canción de los niños muertos, by David Pablos.
2009	SIGNIS	Special mention SIGNIS	El armadillo fronterizo, by Miguel Anaya Borja
2009	RED RENTALS	RED RENTALS	Tierra y pan by Carlos Armella
2010	MEXICAN FICTION	Best short film	Últimos pasajeros, directed by Ricardo Soto
2010	MEXICAN FICTION	Best Director	Felipe Gómez for the short film Lupano Leyva
2010	MEXICAN FICTION	Best screenplay	Erick Garcia Corona and Alexandra Márquez for the short film Amanecer, directed by Erick Garcia Corona
2010	MEXICAN FICTION	Best photography	Andrés León Becker for the short film 5 recuerdos, directed by Oriana Alcaine and Alejandra Márquez
2010	MEXICAN FICTION	Best actress	Leticia Huijara for the short film Las Ovejas pueden pastar seguras, directed by Nestor Sampieri
2010	MEXICAN FICTION	Best Actor	Ramiro Ramírez for the short film A solas, directed by David Romay
2010	MEXICAN FICTION	Best edition	Yibran Asuad for the short film 5 Recuerdos, directed by Oriana Alcaine and Alejandra Márquez
2010	MEXICAN FICTION	Best sound design	Pablo Fernández for el Último Canto del pájaro Cú, directed by Alonso Ruizpalacios.
2010	MEXICAN ANIMATION	Mention for Best short ANIMATION	Martyris directed by Luis Felipe Hernández
2010	MEXICAN ANIMATION	Mention for Best short film Experimental	Tensa Calma directed by Alfredo Salomon
2010	MEXICAN ANIMATION	Mention for Best short film Experimental	Amanecer by Erick García Corona (Gustavo Montiel Pagés)
2010	MEXICAN ANIMATION	Mention for Best short film Experimental	Cinco Recuerdos by Oriana Alcaine and Alejandra Marquez (Iliana Fox)
2010	MEXICAN ANIMATION	Mention for Best short film Experimental	La mina de oro by Jacques Bonnavent (Monica Dionne)
2010	MEXICAN ANIMATION	Mention for Best short film Experimental	Martyris by Luis Felipe Hernández (Javier Arath Cortes)
2010	MEXICAN DOCUMENTARY	Best short film	Cassandro, el exótico directed by Michael Ramos Araizaga
2010	MEXICAN DOCUMENTARY	Best director	Carlos Hernández for Aquellos sin nombre
2010	MEXICAN DOCUMENTARY	Best photography	Juan Carlos Lazo for the short film Solo pase la persona que se va a retratar, directed by Roque Azcuaga
2010	MEXICAN DOCUMENTARY	Special mention for the short film Tragicómico	Autocasting directed by José Luis Soto Ruvalcaba
2010	IBEROAMERICAN	Best short film	Abuelos directed by Michael Wahrmann from Brazil
2010	IBEROAMERICAN	Best Director	Michael Wahrmann for the short film Abuelos from Brazil
2010	IBEROAMERICAN	Best screenplay	Cláudia Varejao and Graca Castanheira, for the short film Un día frió from Portugal
2010	IBEROAMERICAN	Best photography	Rui Xavier, for the short film Un día Frió from Portugal
2010	SIGNIS	Award SIGNIS	La patrona directed by Lizzette Arguello, Mexico
2010	NOT BEEN DONE	Best Skateboarding short film in the professional category	Skater directed by Francisco Manzanares
2010	NOT BEEN DONE	Best Skateboarding short film in the independent category	Out of Bounds directed by Enrique M. Benites
2011	MEXICAN FICTION	Best short	Una noche by Acán Coen
2011	MEXICAN FICTION	Best director	Firmes by Yordi Capó
2011	MEXICAN FICTION	Best screenplay	Acán Coen for Una Noche
2011	MEXICAN FICTION	Best photography	Heriberto Acosta for Firmes
2011	MEXICAN FICTION	Best actor	Mario Zaragoza for Una noche
2011	MEXICAN FICTION	Best actress	María Deschamps for Miel
2011	MEXICAN FICTION	Special mention	Borreguito for La dirección
2011	MEXICAN FICTION	Special mention	To Rubén Pablos's acting in El pescador
2011	MEXICAN FICTION	Special mention	El pescador, screenplay by Samantha Pineda and Davy Giorgi
2011	MEXICAN FICTION	Special mention	De este mundo, work of the actress Diana Lein
2011	MEXICAN FICTION	Special mention	Miel, direction and screenplay by Lucero Sánchez
2011	MEXICAN FICTION	Special mention	Mari Pepa for direction and screenplay of Samuel Kishi
2011	MEXICAN ANIMATION	Best short	Clean es Good by Carlos Matiella
2011	MEXICAN ANIMATION	Special mention	Prita Noire by Sofía Carrillo
2011	MEXICAN ANIMATION	Special mention	Mutatio for concept and realization
2011	MEXICAN DOCUMENTARY	Best DOCUMENTARY	Nunca nunca no dejé ir by Moisés Aisemberg
2011	MEXICAN DOCUMENTARY	Special mention	Río Lerma by Esteban Arrangoiz
2011	MEXICAN DOCUMENTARY	Special mention	Semana santa cora by Omar Osiris and Beatriz B. Bautista
2011	SIGNIS	Award SIGNIS	Firmes by Yordi Capó
2011	IBEROAMERICAN	Best short	El Cortejo by Marina Seresesky from Spain
2011	IBEROAMERICAN	Best director	15 summers later by Pedro Collantes
2011	IBEROAMERICAN	Best screenplay	Protopartículas by Chema García
2011	IBEROAMERICAN	Best photography	Voodoo by Sandro Aguilar de Portugal
2011	IBEROAMERICAN	Special mention	Hidden Soldier by Alejandro Suárez
2011	IBEROAMERICAN	Special mention	Birdboy by Pedro Rivero and Alberto Vázquez
2011	IBEROAMERICAN	Special mention	3,2 Lo que hacen las novias by Jota Linares
2011	INTERNATIONAL	Best short	Colivia by Adrian Sitaru from Romania
2011	INTERNATIONAL	Special mention	Vafor by Kave Nobation from Canada-Mexico
2012	MEXICAN FICTION	Best short	La herida de Lucrecia by Sabrina Maldonado
2012	MEXICAN FICTION	Best director	Sebastian Quintanilla for La Habitación
2012	MEXICAN FICTION	Best screenplay	Alexandra Marquez for Dos de tres by Paulina Rosas
2012	MEXICAN FICTION	Best photography	Alejandro Cantú for Revelación by Acán Coen
2012	MEXICAN FICTION	Best actor	Juan Carlos Barreto for Apocrifo by Ernesto Fundora
2012	MEXICAN FICTION	Best actress	Karina Gidi for La Habitacion by Sebastián Quintanilla
2012	MEXICAN FICTION	Special mention acting	Aida López for La Madre by Ernesto Martínez Bucio
2012	MEXICAN FICTION	Kids and teenagers	Emanuel Espíndola, Alan Fuentes, Sebastián Díaz, Rebeca Tolsá Bolado, Sergio Meneses Villarreal and Assira Abbate Machado, from the castings of the following shorts: Dos de tres by Paulina Rosas, Dentro de uno by Salvador Aguirre, Assemble by Miguel Ferráez, Pollito Chiken, Gallina Hen by Marta Hernaiz Pidal, and Plutón y los planetas by Vonno A. Ambriz.
2012	MEXICAN FICTION	Best edition	Miguel Ferraez for Assemble by Miguel Ferráez
2012	MEXICAN FICTION	Best sound	MCO estudios for Apocrifo by Ernesto Fundora
2012	MEXICAN FICTION	Best art	Rol Juárez Pérez for El Banquete del Clown by Franco Carmona
2012	MEXICAN FICTION	Special mention Art	Sofía Carrillo for Retrato anónimo by Paola Chaurand
2012	MEXICAN FICTION	Special mention	Me extinguiré en el silencio by David Castañón Medina
2012	MEXICAN FICTION	Special mention	Del aire soy by Rodrigo Ugalde de Haene
2012	MEXICAN ANIMATION	Best short	Dame posadas by Cecilio Vargas Torres
2012	MEXICAN ANIMATION	Special mention	A secas by Andreas Papacostas
2012	MEXICAN ANIMATION	Special mention	Teclopolis by Javier Mrad from Argentina
2012	MEXICAN DOCUMENTARY	Best DOCUMENTARY	Fuimos gigantes by Víctor Navarro
2012	MEXICAN DOCUMENTARY	Special mention	Yuban by Ya´asib Vázquez Colmenares
2012	MEXICAN DOCUMENTARY	Special mention	Ruinas by Martín Molina Gola
2012	IBEROAMERICAN	Best short	Salón Royal by Sabrina Campos from Argentina.
2012	IBEROAMERICAN	Special mention	La Matraca de Benfhazi by Paco Torres from Spain and Ireland
2012	INTERNATIONAL	Best short	Normal People by Piotr Zlotorowitcz from Poland
2012	INTERNATIONAL	Special mention	A trois by Vanessa Clement / Jonathan Hazan from France
2012	INTERNATIONAL	Special mention	The Extraordinary Life of Rocky by Kevin Meul and Steven Dhoedt from Belgium
2012	NATIONAL SHORT FILM SCREENPLAY CONTEST	Best Mexican screenplay	Cuando yo era viejo by Armando Narváez del Valle
2012	NATIONAL SHORT FILM SCREENPLAY CONTEST	Special mentions	Carmita by Yoame Escamilla de Arsenal
2012	NATIONAL SHORT FILM SCREENPLAY CONTEST	Special mentions	Mimodrama by Carlos Alvahuante
2012	NATIONAL SHORT FILM SCREENPLAY CONTEST	Special mentions	Esa palabra con C by Karla E. López Romero
2012	Award KUBRIK Universidad de la Comunicación	DOCUMENTARY	Fuimos gigantes by Víctor Navarro
2012	Award KUBRIK Universidad de la Comunicación	FICTION	Assemble by Miguel Ferráez
2012	Award KUBRIK Universidad de la Comunicación	ANIMATION	A secas by Andreas Papacostas
2012	Award MacTrainee	Best Mexican screenplay	Cuando yo era viejo by Armando Narváez del Valle
2012	Award MacTrainee	Best DOCUMENTARY	Fuimos gigantes by Víctor Navarro
2012	Award MacTrainee	Best animation short	Dame posadas by Cecilio Vargas Torres
2012	Award MacTrainee	Best fiction short	La herida de Lucrecia by Sabrina Maldonado
2013	MEXICAN FICTION	Best short	Contrafábula de una niña disecada by Alejandro Iglesias Mendizábal
2013	MEXICAN FICTION	Best director	Alejandro Iglesias Mendizábal for Contrafábula de una niña disecada
2013	MEXICAN FICTION	Best screenplay	Juan Manuel Barreda and Ana Mary Ramos for Inframundo
2013	MEXICAN FICTION	Best photography	Ignacio Miranda for La Tiricia o cómo curar la tristeza
2013	MEXICAN FICTION	Best actor	Pedro Hernández for La banqueta and Kristyan Ferrer for Ratitas
2013	MEXICAN FICTION	Best actress	Concepción Márquez for El cielo en el lago and Andrea Berzosa for forcelana
2013	MEXICAN ANIMATION	Best short	Lluvia en los ojos by Rita Basulto
2013	MEXICAN ANIMATION	Special mention	Electrodoméstico
2013	MEXICAN DOCUMENTARY	Best DOCUMENTARY	La Parka by Gabriel Serra Argüello
2013	MEXICAN DOCUMENTARY	Special mention	B-Boy by Abraham Escobedo Salas
2013	MEXICAN NEOMEX	Best short	Antídoto by Tania Karenni Flores
2013	MEXICAN NEOMEX	Special mention	El silencio by Sinhue Benavides
2013	IBEROAMERICAN	Best short	Voice Over by Martín Rosete from Spain
2013	IBEROAMERICAN	Special mention	Anacos by Xacio Baño from Spain
2013	INTERNATIONAL ANIMATION	Best short	Lady with Flower Hair by Sarah Tabibzadeh from Iran
2013	INTERNATIONAL ANIMATION	Special mention	The Kiosk by Anete Melece from Switzerland
2013	INTERNATIONAL ANIMATION	Special mention	Head over Heels by Timothy Reckart from UK
2013	INTERNATIONAL FICTION	Best short	Death of a Shadow by Tom Van Avermaet (Belgium/France)
2013	INTERNATIONAL FICTION	Special mention	Traje de Baño by Mathilde Bayle (France)
2013	NATIONAL SHORT FILM SCREENPLAY CONTEST	Best Mexican screenplay	Rewind by Santiago Ortiz Monasterio
2014	MEXICAN FICTION	Best short	Matabichos, by Gabriela Palacios
2014	MEXICAN FICTION	Best director	Bella, by Maricarmen Merino
2014	MEXICAN FICTION	Best screenplay	El Sonámbulo, by Lenz Claure
2014	MEXICAN ANIMATION	Best short	El don de los espejos, by Mara Soler Guitián
2014	MEXICAN ANIMATION	Special mention	El modelo de pickman, by Pablo Ángeles
2014	DOCUMENTARY MEXICANO-IBEROAMERICANO	Best DOCUMENTARY MEX	Fuera de Foco, by Adrián Arce and Antonio Zirión
2014	DOCUMENTARY MEXICANO-IBEROAMERICANO	Special mention MEX	Sueño de Juguetes, by Francisco Machado
2014	DOCUMENTARY MEXICANO-IBEROAMERICANO	Best short IA	Godka Cirka, by Alex Lora, Spain
2014	DOCUMENTARY MEXICANO-IBEROAMERICANO	Special mention IA	Prisioneros del Kanun, by Roser Corella, Spain
2014	IBEROAMERICAN	Best short	Minerita, by Raúl de la Fuente, Spain
2014	IBEROAMERICAN	Best director	Óscar Bernácer, Bikini, Spain
2014	IBEROAMERICAN	Best screenplay	Bikini, by Óscar Bernácer, Spain
2014	INTERNATIONAL	Best short	Zima, by Cristina Picchi, Russia
2014	INTERNATIONAL	Best screenplay	Washingtonia, by Konstantina Kotzamani, Greece
2014	INTERNATIONAL	Best director	Ilan Klipper, Juke Box, France
2014	INTERNATIONAL	Special mention	The mass of men, by Gabriel Gauchet, UK
2014	INTERNATIONAL	Special mention	Hasta Santiago, by Mauro Carraro, Switzerland / France
2014	INTERNATIONAL	Special mention	The way back, by Halla Kim, South Korea
2015	MEXICAN FICTION	Best short	Trémulo, by Roberto Fiesco
2015	MEXICAN FICTION	Best director	Roberto Fiesco, for Trémulo
2015	MEXICAN FICTION	Best screenplay	Julio Berthely, for Mientras duermo
2015	MEXICAN FICTION	Best photography	Alejandro Cantú for Trémulo
2015	MEXICAN FICTION	Best sound	Alberto Molero for Nunca regreses
2015	MEXICAN FICTION	Best edition	Aina Calleja for Huellas
2015	MEXICAN FICTION	Best art	Maria José Pizarro for La tiara vacía
2015	MEXICAN FICTION	Best actor	Burak Yigit for Juego de dedos
2015	MEXICAN FICTION	Best actress	Margarita Sanz for Tres variaciones de Ofelia
2015	MEXICAN FICTION	Best production	Huellas, by Jorge Orozco Watson
2015	MEXICAN DOCUMENTARY	Best short	Mucacho en la barra se mastura con rabia y osadía by Julián Hernández
2015	MEXICAN ANIMATION	Best short	Zimbo by Juan José Medina and Rita Basulto
2015	MEXICAN NEOMEX	Best short	Afuera by José Permar
2015	MÉXICO VIDEO	Best short	El incansable amor por la ruta del grupo Ramona
2015	IBEROAMERICAN FICTION	Best ibero-American fiction short film	La Gallina de Manel Raga / Spain
2015	IBEROAMERICAN ANIMATION	Best short	Edificio Tatuapé Mahal by Carolina Marcowicz and Fernando Salloum / Brazil
2015	IBEROAMERICAN DOCUMENTARY	Best short	La Reina by Manuel Abramovich / Argentina
2015	INTERNATIONAL DOCUMENTARY	Best short	Waiting For The (T)rain by Simon Panay / USA
2015	INTERNATIONAL ANIMATION	Best short	Dinner for Few by Nassos Vakalis / Greece
2015	INTERNATIONAL FICTION	Best short	Angels Die In The Soil by Babak Amini / Iran
2015	NATIONAL SHORT FILM SCREENPLAY CONTEST	Best Mexican screenplay	Tutti Frutti by Miguel Saucedo
2016	MEXICAN FICTION	Best short	24 º 51’ Latitud Norte, by Carlos Lenin Treviño, Ana Valentina López De Cea
2016	MEXICAN FICTION	Best director	Carlos Lenin Treviño for 24 º 51’ Latitud Norte
2016	MEXICAN FICTION	Best screenplay	Juliana Orea and Peter Asley Solís for En el estacionamiento
2016	MEXICAN FICTION	Special mention for screenplay	Rodrigo Ruiz Paterson, and Claudia Saint Luce for Australia
2016	MEXICAN FICTION	Best photography	Diego Tenorio for 24 º 51’ Latitud Norte
2016	MEXICAN FICTION	Best sound	Galileo Galaz, Be Flores and Misael Hernández for 24 º 51’ Latitud Norte
2016	MEXICAN FICTION	Best edition	David Zonana and Karen Espinal for Sangre Alba
2016	MEXICAN FICTION	Best art	Estibaliz Valdivia and Leo Juárez for El ocaso de Juan
2016	MEXICAN FICTION	Best costumes	Paula Quintanar and Constanza Martínez for En el estacionamiento
2016	MEXICAN FICTION	Best actor	Kristyan Ferrer for El Ocaso de Juan
2016	MEXICAN FICTION	Best actress	Lisa Owen for Australia
2016	MEXICAN FICTION	Special mention for the actress	María Fernanda Carrillo, for En el estacionamiento
2016	MEXICAN DOCUMENTARY	Best short	Tobías, by Francisco de Acosta and Ramiro E. Pedraza
2016	MEXICAN DOCUMENTARY	Special mention	Club Amazonas, by Roberto Fiesco
2016	MEXICAN DOCUMENTARY	Special mention	Aurelia and Pedro, by José Permar and Omar Robles
2016	MEXICAN ANIMATION	Best short	Revoltoso, by Arturo and Roy Ambriz
2016	MEXICAN ANIMATION	Special mention	Los aeronautas, by León Fernández
2016	MEXICAN ANIMATION	Special mention	Los gatos, by Alejandro Río
2016	MEXICAN NEOMEX	Best short	Puertas, by Soledad Violeta Carbajal
2016	MEXICAN NEOMEX	Special mention	Abducción, by Antonio Ayala Galindo
2016	MEXICAN NEOMEX	Special mention	Luz de día, by Maurico Calderón Mora
2016	IBEROAMERICAN FICTION	Best ibero-American fiction short film	San Cristóbal, by Omar Zuñiga Hidalgo, from Chili
2016	IBEROAMERICAN FICTION	Mention	Lo compró en Zaratutz, by Aitor Arregui, from Spain
2016	IBEROAMERICAN ANIMATION	Best short	La noche del oceano, by María Lorenzo, from Spain
2016	IBEROAMERICAN ANIMATION	Special mention	Un nueve de abril, by Edgar Álvarez, from Colombia
2016	IBEROAMERICAN DOCUMENTARY	Best short	A poquito es noche, by Paula Murcia Restrepo, from Cuba-Colombia
2016	IBEROAMERICAN DOCUMENTARY	Special mention	La impresión de una guerra, by Camilo Restrepo, from Colombia-France
2016	INTERNATIONAL DOCUMENTARY	Best short	Irregulars, by Fabio Palmieri, from Italy
2016	INTERNATIONAL DOCUMENTARY	Special mention	Mining poems or Odes, by Callum Rice, Scotland
2016	INTERNATIONAL ANIMATION	Best short	To Build A Fire, by Fx Goby, from France
2016	INTERNATIONAL ANIMATION	Special mention	Deer Flowers, by Kangmin Kin, from South Korea
2016	INTERNATIONAL FICTION	Best short	Zeus, by Pavel Vesnakov, from Germany
2016	INTERNATIONAL FICTION	Special mention	The Ravens, by Jennifer Perrot, from Australia
2016	Award OF THE AUDIENCE ON LINE	ANIMATION	Revoltoso, by Vonno Arturo Ambriz and Roy Ambriz
2016	Award OF THE AUDIENCE ON LINE	Queer	Libar, by Bárbara Moreno Turcott
2016	Award OF THE AUDIENCE ON LINE	FICTION	La hija prometida
2016	NATIONAL SHORT FILM SCREENPLAY CONTEST	Best Mexican screenplay	Espuma de mar, by Luis Mariano García
2016	NATIONAL SHORT FILM SCREENPLAY CONTEST	Special mention	Psic0nautas, by Israel Granja Hernández
2016	Award OF THE PRESS	Best short	24 º 51’ Latitud Norte, by Carlos Lenin Treviño, Ana Valentina López De Cea
2017	MEXICAN FICTION	Best short	Verde, by Alonso Ruizpalacios
2017	MEXICAN FICTION	Best director	Alonso Ruizpalacios, for Verde
2017	MEXICAN FICTION	Best screenplay	Antonio de Jesús Sánchez, for La Ramona
2017	MEXICAN FICTION	Best photography	Julio Llorente, for Loving South
2017	MEXICAN FICTION	Best sound	Javier Umpierrez, for Verde
2017	MEXICAN FICTION	Best edition	Sheila Altamirano and Esteban Arrangoiz, for Peñas
2017	MEXICAN FICTION	Best art	Javier Umpierrez, for Verde
2017	MEXICAN FICTION	Best costumes	Alex Caraza and Eloise Kazan, for Julkita
2017	MEXICAN FICTION	Best actor	Gerardo Taracena, for La Ramona
2017	MEXICAN FICTION	Best actress	Meraqui Pradis, for Fuerza Bruta
2017	MEXICAN ANIMATION	Best short	Cerulia, by Sofía Carrillo
2017	MEXICAN ANIMATION	Special mention	Poliangular, by Alexandra Castellanos Solís
2017	MEXICAN DOCUMENTARY	Special meSogon	La yarda, by Francisco Javier Sandoval
2017	MEXICAN DOCUMENTARY	Best short	Relato Familiar, by Sumie García
2017	MEXICAN DOCUMENTARY	Special mention	Semillas de Guamúchil, by Carolina Corral Paredes
2017	MEXICAN DOCUMENTARY	Special mention	Los árboles no dejan ver el bosque, by Gastón Andrade
2017	MEXICAN NEOMEX	Special mention	Tierra Baldía, by Argenis Salinas Pineda
2017	MEXICAN NEOMEX	Best short	Bestia, by José Permar
2017	MEXICAN NEOMEX	Special mention	El sabor de los nudillos, by Dante Alejandro Silva Treviño
2017	MEXICAN NEOMEX	Special mention	Colapso, by Santiago González Gavilanes
2017	IBEROAMERICAN FICTION	Special mention	Hijo por Hijo, by Juan Avellar, from Venezuela
2017	IBEROAMERICAN FICTION	Best ibero-American fiction short film	Culiaos, by Samuel González, from Chile
2017	IBEROAMERICAN ANIMATION	Mention	Here's the plan, by Fernanda Frick, from Chile
2017	IBEROAMERICAN ANIMATION	Mention	La casa de los colores, by Nicolas Villareal, from Argentina
2017	IBEROAMERICAN ANIMATION	Best short	Corp, by Pablo Polledri, from Argentina
2017	IBEROAMERICAN DOCUMENTARY	Best short	Bolingo, el Bosque del amor, by Alejandro G. Salgado, from Spain
2017	INTERNATIONAL ANIMATION	Special mention	I think you are a little confused, by Iku Ogawa, from Japan
2017	INTERNATIONAL ANIMATION	Best short	Au Revoir Balthazar, by Rafel Sommerhalder, from Switzerland.
2017	INTERNATIONAL DOCUMENTARY	Best short	One day in Aleppo, by Ali Alibrahim, from Syria-Sweden-Denmark
2017	INTERNATIONAL DOCUMENTARY	Special mention	Speaking is difficult, by A. J. Schnack, from USA
2017	INTERNATIONAL FICTION	Special mention	Semele, by Myrsini Aristidou, from Greece
2017	INTERNATIONAL FICTION	Best short	Minh Tam, by Vincent Maury, from France
2017	AWARD OF THE ASOCIACION DE MUJERES EN EL CINE Y LA TV		Taller de Corazones Luisa Alba, for Filamentos
2017	NATIONAL SHORT FILM SCREENPLAY CONTEST	Best Mexican screenplay	Eternity, by Davy Giorgi and Samantha Pineda
2018	MEXICAN FICTION	Best short	Los desterrados hijos de Eva, by Omar Robles
2018	MEXICAN FICTION	Best director	El aire delgado, by Pablo Giles
2018	MEXICAN FICTION	Best screenplay	Mamartuile, Gabriel Nuncio
2018	MEXICAN FICTION	Best photography	Ulises, Tonatiuh Martínez
2018	MEXICAN FICTION	Best sound	Ulises, Rodrigo Barberá and José Iván Aguilera
2018	MEXICAN FICTION	Best edition	Laura y el viento, Natali Montell, Arián Sánchez and Gabriela Ruvalcaba
2018	MEXICAN FICTION	Best art	Mamartuile, Oscar Tello
2018	MEXICAN FICTION	Best costumes	Los desterrados hijos de Eva, Constanza Martínez
2018	MEXICAN FICTION	Best actor	El futuro, Krystian Ferrer
2018	MEXICAN FICTION	Best actress	El futuro, Jana Raluy
2018	MEXICAN DOCUMENTARY	Best short	La sombra de un Dios, by Bernhard Hetzenauer
2018	MEXICAN DOCUMENTARY	Special mention	Oro Rosado, by Daniel Anguiano Zúñiga
2018	MEXICAN ANIMATION	Best short	In a heartbeat, by Esteban Bravo and Beth David
2018	MEXICAN NEOMEX	Best short	El último romántico, by Natalia García Agraz
2018	MEXICAN NEOMEX	Special mention	Espuma de mar, by Luis Mariano García
2018	IBEROAMERICAN FICTION	Best ibero-American fiction short film	Lucy, by Roberto Gutiérrez (Venezuela)
2018	IBEROAMERICAN ANIMATION	Best short	Lupus, by Carlos Gómez Salamanca (Colombia/ France)
2018	IBEROAMERICAN ANIMATION	Special mention	O vestido de Myriam, by Lucas H. Rossi (Brazil)
2018	IBEROAMERICAN ANIMATION	Special mention	Rabia, by Romina Tamburello (Argentina)
2018	IBEROAMERICAN DOCUMENTARY	Best short	Detroit ́s Rivera, by Julio Ramos (Puerto Rico/ USA)
2018	IBEROAMERICAN DOCUMENTARY	Special mention	Here - Ici, by Cayetano Espinosa (Peru)
2018	IBEROAMERICAN DOCUMENTARY	Special mention	Drop by drop, by Alexandra Ramírez and Laura Goncalves (Portugal)
2018	INTERNATIONAL DOCUMENTARY	Best short	Edith+Eddie, by Laura Checkoway and Thomas Lee Wright, USA
2018	INTERNATIONAL DOCUMENTARY	Special mention	The rabbit hunt, by Patrick Bresnan, USA and Hungary
2018	INTERNATIONAL ANIMATION	Best short	Sog, by Jonatan Schwenk, Germany
2018	INTERNATIONAL FICTION	Best short	Adele, by Mirene Igwabi, Australia
2018	INTERNATIONAL FICTION	Special mention	May Day, by Olivier Magis and Fedrik De Beul, Belgium
2018	NATIONAL SHORT FILM SCREENPLAY CONTEST	Best Mexican screenplay	Recalentado es Best, by Alba Cecilia Garza and Diana López
2018	Award OF THE PRESS	Special mention	Ulises, by Jorge Malpica
2018	Award OF THE PRESS	Best short	Al caer la noche, by Rocko Desvan
2019	MEXICAN FICTION	Best short	Playa Gaviotas by Eduardo Esquivel
2019	MEXICAN FICTION	Best director	Laura Baumeister, for Water Navel.
2019	MEXICAN FICTION	Best screenplay	Betzabé García, for The girl with two heads.
2019	MEXICAN FICTION	Best cinematography	Alana Mejía González, for The Girl with Two Heads.
2019	MEXICAN FICTION	Best sound	Fernando Gómez, Paulina Villavicencio and Óscar Victoria, for No Returns.
2019	MEXICAN FICTION	Best editing	Eduardo Spiegeler and Julián Sarmiento, for Navel of water.
2019	MEXICAN FICTION	Best art	Lou Peresandi, for The Witch of the Walking Match.
2019	MEXICAN FICTION	Best costumes	Lilia Hernández, for The walking witch match.
2019	MEXICAN FICTION	Best actor	Noé Hernández, by Arcángel.
2019	MEXICAN FICTION	Best actress	Tessa Ia, for No Returns. Sofía Espinosa, for No Returns.
2019	MEXICAN DOCUMENTARY	Best short	Goodbye, Goodbye, Goodbye, by Ricardo Castro.
2019	MEXICAN DOCUMENTARY	Special mention	Symphony of a sad sea, by Carlos Mario Morales García
2019	MEXICAN ANIMATION	Best short	Grandma´s pie, by Ricardo San Emeterio (Mexico / USA).
2019	MEXICAN ANIMATION	Special Mention	Adelina, by Ana Portilla. Gina by David Diomedes Heras
2019	MEXICAN NEOMEX	Best short	Lazareto, by Gustavo Hernández De Anda.
2019	MEXICAN NEOMEX	Special mention	We exist in silence, by Héctor Ibarra Jiménez.
2019	IBEROAMERICAN FICTION	Best ibero-American fiction short film	Matria, by Álvaro Gago (Spain).
2019	IBEROAMERICAN ANIMATION	Best short	Agouro, by David Doutel and Vasco Sá (Portugal / France).
2019	IBEROAMERICAN DOCUMENTARY	Best short	We were waiting for it to get dark, by Wendi V. Muñiz and Guillermo Zouain (Dominican Republic - USA).
2019	IBEROAMERICAN DOCUMENTARY	Special mention	Laatash, by Elena Molina (Spain).
2019	INTERNATIONAL DOCUMENTARY	Best short	The space shuttle challenger, by Cecilia Araneda (Canada).
2019	INTERNATIONAL ANIMATION	Best short	Raymonde Ou L'evasion Verticale, by Sarah Van Den Boom (France).
2019	INTERNATIONAL FICTION	Best short	Skin, by Guy Nattiv (USA).
2019	NATIONAL SHORT FILM SCREENPLAY CONTEST	Best Mexican screenplay	Pinky promise, by Indra Villaseñor Amador.
2019	Award OF THE PRESS	Special mention	The Witch of the strolling phosphor, by Sofía Carrillo. The Missing Persons Press Award, by Astrid Domínguez
2019	Award OF THE PRESS	Best short	Arcángel, by Ángeles Cruz.
