= Nathan Ballingrud =

American author (born 1970)

- Born: December 31, 1970 (age 55)
- Education: University of North Carolina; University of New Orleans
- Writing career
- Years active: 1995–present
- Notable work: North American Lake Monsters
- Website: nathanballingrud.com

Nathan Ballingrud (born December 31, 1970) is an American writer of horror and dark fantasy fiction. His novella, The Visible Filth, was adapted into a feature film titled Wounds by Babak Anvari. The film is distributed by Annapurna Pictures, premiering on the Sundance Film Festival on January 26, 2019. The film rights to his novel, The Strange, have been acquired by Black Label Media.

== Awards ==
Ballingrud's stories have received critical acclaim and were nominated for multiple awards.

- In 2007, "The Monsters of Heaven" won the Shirley Jackson Award for Best Short Story
- In 2013, North-American Lake Monsters won the Shirley Jackson Award for Best Single-Author Short Story Collection
- In 2013, North-American Lake Monsters was nominated for the Bram Stoker Award for Superior Achievement in a Fiction Collection
- In 2014, North-American Lake Monsters was shortlisted for the World Fantasy Award for Best Collection
- In 2014, North-American Lake Monsters was shortlisted for the British Fantasy Award for best Collection
- Cathedral of the Drowned won the 2025 Bram Stoker Award for Superior Achievement in Long Fiction.

== Bibliography ==
=== Books ===
- North American Lake Monsters (2013)
- The Visible Filth (2015)
- Wounds: Six Stories from the Border of Hell (2019); re-released as The Atlas of Hell (2025)
- The Strange (2023)
- Crypt of the Moon Spider (novella, 2024)
- Cathedral of the Drowned (novella, 2025)
