= Wounds (film) =

2019 film directed by Babak Anvari

- Hulu release poster
- Directed by: Babak Anvari
- Written by: Babak Anvari
- Based on: The Visible Filth by Nathan Ballingrud
- Produced by: Christopher Kopp; Lucan Toh
- Starring: Armie Hammer; Dakota Johnson; Zazie Beetz
- Cinematography: Kit Fraser
- Edited by: Chris Barwell
- Production companies: Annapurna Pictures; Two & Two Pictures; AZA Film
- Distributed by: Hulu (United States); Netflix (international)
- Release dates: January 26, 2019 (Sundance); October 18, 2019 (United States)
- Running time: 94 minutes
- Countries: United States; United Kingdom
- Language: English

Wounds is a 2019 psychological horror film written and directed by Babak Anvari, in his English language debut, and starring Armie Hammer, Dakota Johnson, and Zazie Beetz. The film is based on the novella The Visible Filth by Nathan Ballingrud.

The film had its world premiere at the Sundance Film Festival on January 26, 2019, and was released in the United States on October 18, 2019, by Hulu and internationally on Netflix.

== Plot ==
Will is a New Orleans–based bartender who works at a run-down cockroach-infested bar. One evening Alicia (one of his exes), her current boyfriend Jeffrey, a drunk friend called Eric, and a group of college kids are among the clientele in the bar. Eric gets into a fight with another customer, resulting in Eric being stabbed in the cheek with a broken bottle. The kids leave the bar in a panic and Will discovers one of them has left their phone behind. Will returns to his house, which he shares with his student girlfriend Carrie. While inspecting the phone, he receives messages from someone called Garrett, who claims that he is scared and something from the "tunnel" is following him.

The next morning, Will awakens to discover that overnight, Garrett has sent the phone a photo that shows a pile of bloody teeth. Carrie insists they call the police. Will drops Carrie off at school, where he suspects her professor is sleeping with her.

He goes to check on Eric, whose wound is now infected. Eric claims he is suffering from nightmares, but refuses to seek medical help. Will spots some sort of inhuman flesh in Eric's wound.

Will then visits Alicia and it is revealed that he still has a crush on her and envies Jeffrey.

Returning home, Will doesn't notice one of the college kids following him around town. He discovers photos and videos on the phone of a corpse and severed head surrounded by cockroaches. Carrie sees the footage and forces Will to hand it over to the police. She sees a book in one of the photos entitled "The Translation of Wounds". They call Garrett and hear an inhuman screeching on the other end.

While driving to the station, Will spots one of the college kids following him and receives messages from another member of the group, stating that he "has been chosen". Will hallucinates the phone turning into a cockroach creature and throws it out of the car window, where it is picked up by one of the kids. Without the phone, the police cannot do anything.

Will hangs with Alicia and they make out, but Alicia stops, feeling guilty. Will receives strange texts from Carrie and discovers her at home, staring at a strange video of a tunnel in a trance. Carrie has no memory of sending Will the texts. Later that night, Will awakens to discover Garrett in the house. Garrett throws up a pile of teeth before claiming he and his friends summoned "something", that it possessed them and Will has now brought it into his own home: it now sees him as "the perfect vessel for more".

Will hallucinates a cockroach crawling out of a wound in his armpit. Will and Carrie start to get more distant and aggressive to one another. He discovers she has been searching for Garrett online, as well as the books she noticed in the photo and Gnostic rituals which state that a wound is a portal for higher beings to enter the world. At work, Will gets more and more erratic and starts a fight with Jeffrey. He receives another text from Carrie, claiming someone is in the house with her. Will rushes home and discovers her in a trance again. She is in a catatonic state that does not stop until she is bathed, which results in a strange dark liquid washing off her. The next day, she and Will break up, with Carrie accusing Will of being empty.

Will goes to work and snaps at his boss, resulting in him quitting, while Alicia tells him to stop calling her. Broken and alone, Will decides to stay at Eric's house. Eric's wound has worsened. He reveals the college kids forced him to lure Will to the house, and they asked him to give Will "a present". Will spots an eye looking at him through Eric's wound. He discovers the phone in Eric's possession and is prompted to accept the "present" wrapped in flesh. He realizes the higher being the kids summoned is inside Eric's wound. After calling Garrett again, which fills the room with the inhuman screeching, a swarm of cockroaches arrives. Will finally submits and starts to absorb the higher being in an attempt to become whole as cockroaches envelop the house.

== Cast ==
- Armie Hammer as Will
- Dakota Johnson as Carrie
- Zazie Beetz as Alicia
- Karl Glusman as Jeffrey
- Brad William Henke as Eric
- Jim Klock as Patrick
- Luke Hawx as Marvin
- Kerry Cahill as Rosie
- Terrence Rosemore as Duane Cross
- Ben Sanders as Jason

== Production ==
In February 2018, it was announced Armie Hammer had been cast in the film, with Babak Anvari writing and directing the film. Megan Ellison, Christopher Kopp, and Lucan Toh produced the film under their Annapurna Pictures, AZA Films, Two & Two Pictures banners, respectively. In March 2018, Dakota Johnson and Zazie Beetz joined the cast of the film. In April 2018, Karl Glusman, Brad William Henke and Jim Klock joined the cast.

Principal photography began on April 4, 2018, in New Orleans.

== Release ==
The film had its world premiere at the Sundance Film Festival on January 26, 2019. It also screened at the Cannes Film Festival in the Directors Fortnight section on May 22, 2019. The film was scheduled to be released on March 29, 2019. However, it was pulled from the schedule. It was released in the United States on October 18, 2019, by Hulu. Netflix distributed the film internationally in all territories outside of the United States on October 18, 2019.

== Reception ==
Wounds received mixed reviews from film critics. It holds a 47% approval rating on review aggregator website Rotten Tomatoes, based on 59 reviews, with an average of 5.1/10. The site's critical consensus reads, "Wounds isn't without its creepy-crawly charms, but they – and the efforts of a talented cast – get squished by a story that never quite gets completely under the skin." On Metacritic, the film holds a rating of 51 out of 100, based on 12 critics, indicating "mixed or average reviews".
