= To Build a Fire =

Short story by Jack London

- Short story by Jack London
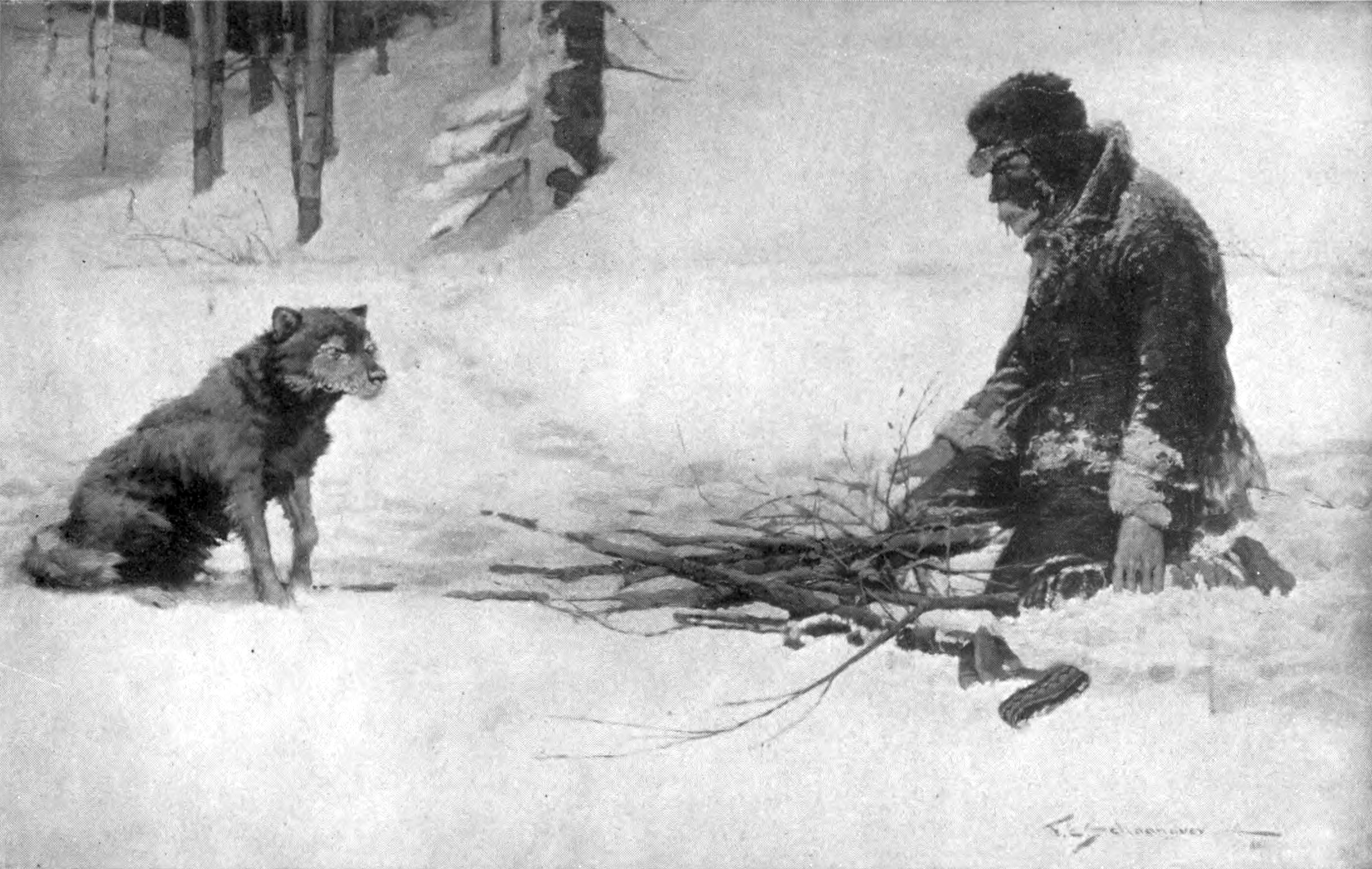
- A man sits in front of the ruins of a fire. A dog sits across from him, eager for the nonexistent heat.

Text available at Wikisource
- Illustrator: Frank Earle Schoonover
- Country: United States
- Language: English
- Genres: Adventure, short story, tragedy, literary naturalism

Publication
- Published in: Youth's Companion, The Century Magazine
- Publisher: Youth's Companion, The Century Magazine, MacMillan Inc.
- Media type: magazine
- Publication date: 1902, 1908, 1910

"To Build a Fire" is a short story by American author Jack London. There are two versions of this story. The first version was published in 1902; the second, later version was published in 1908 and republished in 1910. The story written in 1908 has become an often anthologized classic, while the 1902 story is less well known.

The 1908 version is about an unnamed male protagonist who ventures out in the subzero boreal forest of the Yukon Territory. He is accompanied by a native husky dog and is en route to visit his friends—ignoring warnings from an older man from Sulphur Creek about the dangers of hiking alone in extreme cold. The protagonist underestimates the harsh conditions and freezes to death after his fire is doused and he is unable to re-light it.

In the 1902 version, though the structure and storyline are similar, the weather is not as cold and horrendous, no dog follows the protagonist, the fire is not doused, and the man (named Tom Vincent in this version) suffers only from severe frostbite and survives to become a more melancholic but wiser person.

"To Build a Fire" is an oft-cited example of the naturalist movement that portrays the conflict of man versus nature. It also reflects London's personal experiences in the Yukon Territory.

== 1908 version plot ==
The unnamed man, a chechaquo (newcomer to the Yukon), sets out to hike through the forests bordering the Yukon River on a winter day where the temperature has fallen to −75 °F (−59 °C). Having ignored warnings against traveling alone in such conditions, he is accompanied only by a large husky dog. The animal's instincts warn it about the dangers of the extreme cold, but the dog reluctantly follows the man. As they follow the course of a frozen creek, the man is careful to avoid patches of thin ice hidden by the snow. His goal is to reach a group of prospectors (referred to as "the boys") at their camp by six o'clock that evening.

At half-past noon, the man stops and builds a fire so he can warm up and eat his lunch. Shortly after resuming his hike, he accidentally breaks through the ice and soaks his feet and lower legs, forcing him to stop and build another fire so he can dry himself. Having chosen a spot under a tree for this fire, he pulls twigs from the brush pile around it to feed the flames; the vibrations of this action eventually cause a large amount of snow to tumble down from the branches overhead and extinguish the fire. The man quickly begins to lose sensation in his extremities and hurries to light another fire, now starting to understand the warnings about the life-threatening danger posed by the extreme cold. He lights the fire, igniting all of his matches and burning himself in the process due to the numbness in his hands. While trying to remove a piece of moss from the fire, he inadvertently pokes the burning twigs apart, extinguishing them.

With no way to start another fire, the man thinks of killing the dog and using its body heat to save himself, but his hands are so stiff that he can neither strangle the animal nor draw his knife to cut its throat. Finally, he tries to restore his circulation by running toward the camp, but stumbles and falls multiple times in the snow. The man feels the cold gradually freezing him to his core, and he ultimately falls asleep and dies of hypothermia. He imagines himself standing with "the boys" as they find his body. The dog leaves the body after dark to find food and shelter at the camp.

== Themes ==
Man versus nature is a major theme in the story. The protagonist decides to face the brutally cold temperatures of the Yukon Trail despite being warned by an older man. The short story depicts the protagonist's battle of life and death while highlighting the importance of the fire. Lee Mitchell, in a familiar critique of London's work, comments on London's usage of naturalism in his plots. In Mitchell's opinion, the efforts of emphasizing the environment too much suggest that, "[i]n turn, everything that somehow contributes to those attempts is doubled and re-doubled, iterated and re-iterated, leaving nothing to occur only once" (Mitchell 78) throughout the story.

One theme illustrated in the story is the man's sense of judgment contrasted with the dog's animal instincts. Throughout the story, London hints that the dog has more knowledge of survival than the man; the judgment-versus-instinct theme is evident when the man builds the first fire. While the dog wants to stay by the fire to keep warm, the man is determined to keep moving. As the dog reluctantly follows the man across a frozen river, the dog is more cautious than the man.

The protagonist's desperation is evident throughout the majority of the story. It is noticeable soon after the man falls into a frozen-over river. To save himself he scrambles to build a fire, but is too busy worrying about his survival to notice the mistake of building a fire underneath a tree that has collected an enormous amount of snow. After the first fire is put out, his desperation becomes more defined as he seemingly will do anything to survive, including attempting to kill his dog for warmth and using all his matches at once in a final attempt to light a fire. His desperation for survival and his fear of death cause him to panic, leading to his final demise as he freezes to death at the end of the story.

=== Perseverance ===
Another evident theme in the story is perseverance. Although the man makes several mistakes and gets frostbite in his fingers and toes, he continues to fight for survival. He ignores all the signs that he would not make it to the village he was headed to. For instance, London described “He did not bare his fingers more than a minute and was surprised to find that they were numb". In less than 60 seconds, his fingers were numb, indicating to him that it is too dangerous for him to be outside, yet he progresses despite how dangerous it is.

=== Wisdom and experience ===
Wisdom and experience is another theme that is present throughout the story. London shows that the man lacks the knowledge needed to survive in the Yukon. Based on instincts, the dog knew that it was too cold to travel in the snow. London wrote: "The dog was sorry to leave and looked toward the fire". This line indicates that the dog wanted to be closer to heat. However, the unnamed protagonist ignored all the signs before him. He knew that it was cold but he did not realize the threat this posed on his life. The man's ability to develop arrogance worked against him here, whereas the dog knew better just based on instinct.

Stupidity and arrogance are personified in the story's protagonist. For example, he goes through the extremely cold territory alone, despite going for the first time. He laughs off the crucial advice from the old man of Sulphur Creek about traveling with an acquaintance because he thinks he knows what he's doing. This arrogance results in the protagonist putting himself in a dangerous situation that was preventable. At first, he thinks it's nothing and that everything will be fine. By the end of the story, he dies as a result of his arrogance. Through this story, London shows how the man's demise is due to his humanity and lack of knowledge when entering this journey. Also, he shows that the dog survives because of following its instincts which is something that the man does not pay attention to. The superior mindset and lack of knowledge of the area around where he traveled led to his downfall as well.

Another example of arrogance occurs when the protagonist disregards the possibility that there may be situations he cannot overcome. The old man warns the protagonist of this and also seems to have a better understanding of the natural world, respecting the fact that there are some situations the man will be unable to control. Not only does the old man see the protagonist's stupidity, but the dog notices the man's lack of knowledge about the terrain's obstacles and challenges after he fails to keep a fire going.

=== Death ===
Succumbing to death is another theme in the story, more specifically, the peace that may be found in death. London foreshadows the death of the man early in the story, so it is not a surprise that the man dies, and closer to the end he recalls the cold and the old-timer as he accepts his fate. However, London depicts death quite differently than many other authors do. The man drifts off into a calm, peaceful slumber devoid of suffering and pain. London's use of relaxing words dissuades the reader from feeling a great deal of sympathy for the man, as the death is merciful and graciously anticipated, rather than sad. In contrast to more dramatic depictions of death, London's depiction reveals death as a peaceful escape from tumult and pain.

The description of the protagonist's death has been associated with the discovery of one's self: specifically, that self-discovery is "not a significant psychic discovery" as it results in "the simple physical discovery that the self is body only".

=== Individualism ===
Individualism is another common theme that London portrays in the story. The man only relies on himself and attempts to sacrifice the dog to get him through the Yukon; he doesn't believe that he needs any help. This concept can also be connected to the theme mentioned above of the man's judgment, and the man's arrogance.

== 1902 version ==
The earlier version was first published in The Youth's Companion on May 29, 1902. It was published in Klondike. Although it differs in some details, the general structure and storyline are similar; the primary differences are as follows: in the first version it is not as cold, there is no dog, and the man (named Tom Vincent) mangages to build another fire without dousing it, suffering some permanent frostbite damage but survives wiser. Another difference between the two versions comes from Clell Petersen's analysis of "To Build a Fire". He argues that the 1902 narrator has a love of life that the 1908 narrator lacks, this causes Tom Vincent (the 1902 narrator) to persevere through his journey and not "sit down and die". While the later narrator tries to fight his imminent death he lacks the "'love of life' that would force him to struggle to the end", so he, in the end, accepts it and doesn't complete his journey.

This story may be based on a true story as related by author Jeremiah Lynch in his book Three Years in the Klondike written about 1898. The anecdote in the book is closely mirrored by Jack London's “fictional” story.

== Legacy ==
The story was retold in a 2018 graphic novel by Christophe Chabouté, entitled Construire un feu.

The story is mentioned in Haruki Murakami's short story "Landscape With Flatiron", featured in after the quake.

=== Related films ===
- Construire un feu (1927–1928) is an early short film by Claude Autant-Lara.
- To Build a Fire (1969) was made by David Cobham, with Ian Hogg as the man and Orson Welles as the narrator.
- To Build a Fire (2003) is a French version starring Olivier Pagès.
- Build a Fire (2011) is an American version with a modified story.
- To Build a Fire (2016) is an animated short film directed by Fx Goby.
- COLD (2015) is a Spanish short film based on this story.

== See also ==
- "The Little Match Girl", an 1845 short story by Hans Christian Andersen about a child dying of hypothermia
- "The Beggar Boy at Christ's Christmas Tree", an 1876 short story by Fyodor Dostoevsky
