= Two & Two (2011 film) =

- Directed by: Babak Anvari
- Written by: Babak Anvari; Gavin Cullen
- Produced by: Babak Anvari; Kit Fraser
- Release date: September 11, 2011
- Running time: 8 minutes
- Country: United Kingdom
- Language: Persian (subtitles in English are seen throughout the movie)

Two & Two is a 2011 political themed short film directed by Babak Anvari, co-produced by Babak Anvari and Kit Fraser and written by Babak Anvari and Gavin Cullen. The short film, which runs for 8 minutes, stars a male teacher, played by Bijan Daneshmand, and twelve students in a grey wall classroom, showing the first lesson, which is an expression of 2 + 2 = 5. It is notably similar to the novel Nineteen Eighty-Four by George Orwell.

== Plot ==
The film begins with a suited, male teacher entering a decaying, dirty classroom with twelve schoolboys. Through an intercom on the wall, the headmaster announces that there will be ongoing changes in the school and that the students are to listen to all instructions from their teacher. The teacher then begins the lesson by writing "2 + 2 = 5" on the chalkboard. When the children protest, he immediately silences them, calling for order in the classroom. He then continuously commands the students to repeat the equation after him. One timid student raises his hand and carefully suggests that two plus two is four, not five. The teacher calmly commands him, "Don't think, you don't have to think," and again reassures the students that the answer is indeed five. The teacher then demands the class to copy the incorrect equation into their notebooks. Another student stands up in protest and adamantly shouts that the answer is four instead. The teacher angrily asks him, "Who gave you permission to speak?" The student holds his ground, maintaining that two plus two is equal to four. Further attempts by the teacher to force the student to acknowledge that two plus two equals five fails. He then leaves the classroom and returns with three older students, bearing red armbands and an army-like stature. The teacher asks the senior students for the solution to the equation, and the three answer five in perfect union. The student remains determined, and is called to the front of the room, where he is handed a piece of chalk to complete the equation, "2 + 2 = ." Clearly frustrated, the teacher tells the student that this is his last chance to give the correct answer. The three senior students suddenly raise their arms and point seemingly invisible rifles at the boy against the board, imitating an execution. The boy, after some deliberation, boldly writes "4." The teacher is visibly disappointed, and sudden gunfire is heard as blood splatters across the blackboard and the boy's body slumps, lifeless, to the ground. The rest of the class is silent, stone faces processing what they had just seen. The senior students proceed to carry out the dead boy's body, and the teacher resumes his lesson as if nothing occurred. As the teacher continues to order the students to write down "2 + 2 = 5" in their notebooks. At last, one student is seen scratching out "5" and replacing it with a careful "4."

== Nominees ==
Two & Two was nominated for the 2011 BAFTA Film Awards for Best Short Film.

== Cast ==
- Bijan Daneshmand - Teacher
- Ravi Karimi - Student 1
- Pouyan Lotfi - Student 2
- Amir Pasha Jafarzadeh - Student 3
- Kian Raei - Additional Student
- Mashhoud Kagorynajed - Additional Student
- Amir Mostaed - Additional Student
