= 20 Fingers (film) =

- Directed by: Mania Akbari
- Written by: Mania Akbari
- Produced by: Bijan Daneshmand
- Starring: Bijan Daneshmand; Mania Akbari
- Cinematography: Turaj Aslani
- Edited by: Mania Akbari
- Release date: September 1, 2004 (Venice Film Festival)
- Running time: 72 minutes
- Country: Iran
- Language: Persian

20 Angosht, released in English-speaking markets as 20 Fingers, is a 2004 Iranian film directed by Mania Akbari. It stars the director herself and producer Bijan Daneshmand as a couple (or possibly different couples) discussing their relationship and arguing in seven vignettes shot in several long takes on a DV camera.

The film deals with controversial topics such as divorce and homosexuality and has not yet received permission to be shown uncut in its native country. It has achieved mild international success, winning Best Digital Film at the 61st Venice International Film Festival in 2004, where it premiered.

== Awards ==
- Winner of the Best feature film in Venezia Cinema Digital Section (Venice, Italy - 2004)
- The Grand jury prize for the spirit of freedom in Bahamas International Film Festival (Bahamas - 2004)
- Special Mention Femina International Women's Film Festival (Rio de Janeiro, Brazil - 2005)
- Winner of Best Director and Best Actress Digital International Barcelona Film Festival (Barcelona, Spain - 2005)
- Winner of the Most Innovative film Award Wine Country International Film Festival (California, USA - 2005)
