= Hallow Road =

2025 film by Babak Anvari

- Theatrical release poster
- Directed by: Babak Anvari
- Screenplay by: William Gillies
- Produced by: Ian Henry; Lucan Toh; Aram Tertzakian; Nate Bolotin; Richard Bolger
- Starring: Rosamund Pike; Matthew Rhys; Megan McDonnell
- Cinematography: Kit Fraser
- Edited by: Laura Jennings
- Music by: Lorne Balfe; Peter Adams
- Production companies: XYZ Films; LNDN.; Two and Two Pictures
- Distributed by: Universal Pictures (United Kingdom and Ireland)
- Release dates: 7 March 2025 (SXSW); 16 May 2025 (United Kingdom and Ireland)
- Running time: 80 minutes
- Countries: Czech Republic; Ireland; United Kingdom
- Language: English
- Box office: $220,585

Hallow Road is a 2025 psychological horror film directed by Babak Anvari and written by William Gillies. The film stars Rosamund Pike and Matthew Rhys as a married couple who attempt to help their daughter cover up the evidence of a car accident that she caused.

== Plot ==
Following an argument and fleeing the house after telling her parents she is pregnant, eighteen-year-old Alice calls her mom, Maddie, in a panic during the night; she has struck a girl on remote Hallow Road. Alice claims she has already called an ambulance. As Maddie and her husband Frank race to reach her, Maddie, a paramedic, coaches her through CPR until Alice insists she has crushed the girl’s chest.

During the call, Alice admits she is high on MDMA and never actually called emergency services. Frank vows to take the blame as Alice was driving his car. Alice then reports another car approaching. At Frank’s urging, she drags the body into the undergrowth, only to panic that the girl’s face is “changing.” A strange woman appears, claiming she and her husband are out driving and offering help. Her tone shifts from gentle to intrusive and threatening as she refuses to leave Alice alone.

When Alice tries to flee, Maddie and Frank hear the woman smash the quarter glass of the car. The woman insists the girl Alice hit is alive and with her husband, pressures the family for explanations. Frank confesses he planned to take responsibility, which seems to satisfy her. Maddie, shaken, admits she recently quit her paramedic job after misdiagnosing a fatal pulmonary embolism. Alice decides she will own up to her actions.

When Maddie and Frank finally reach Hallow Road, Alice and the couple are gone. A body lies in the brush. Frank examines it and returns with the devastating claim that it is Alice. Maddie refuses to accept it and calls Alice’s phone, only for Alice to answer, sounding kidnapped. The woman taunts them, declaring that she and her husband “correct” girls like Alice through a rectification process and will do the same to her unborn child. The call ends as police block the road.

By morning, officers treat the corpse —apparently Alice— as the victim of a hit‑and‑run. Detectives conclude that Maddie and Frank’s belief they spoke to Alice afterward is a trauma‑induced delusion, leaving the couple silent and shattered.

== Cast ==
- Rosamund Pike as Maddie
- Matthew Rhys as Frank
- Megan McDonnell as Alice (voice)
- Paul Tylak as an officer
- Stephen Jones as a detective

== Production ==
=== Development ===
The film is directed by Babak Anvari from a script by William Gillies. Ian Henry of London Film & TV and Lucan Toh of Two & Two Pictures produced alongside Richard Bolger of Hail Mary Pictures, with funding from IPR.VC, XYZ Films and Screen Ireland.

=== Casting ===
Rosamund Pike and Matthew Rhys were cast as the married couple at the centre of the story with Megan McDonnell as their daughter. Paul Tylak plays a police officer.

=== Filming ===
Principal photography took place in late 2023 in Prague and Ireland. Filming locations included Greystones, County Wicklow in November 2023. Filming also took place at the FAK Films facility in Kladno, Czech Republic.

== Release ==
It premiered at the 2025 South by Southwest Film & TV Festival in March. It was released in the United Kingdom and Ireland by Universal Pictures on 16 May 2025. XYZ Films will distribute the film in the United States.

== Reception ==
On the review aggregator website Rotten Tomatoes, 88% of 56 critics' reviews are positive. The website's consensus reads: "Minimalist in presentation while getting great mileage out of Rosamund Pike and Matthew Rhys's superb performances, Hallow Road is a nerve-wracking thriller that takes audiences down a haunting path." Metacritic, which uses a weighted average, assigned the film a score of 69 out of 100, based on 19 critics, indicating "generally favorable" reviews.

In December 2025, the screenplay by William Gillies was included in the best of the year by Peter Bradshaw in The Guardian.
