= To Build a Fire (film) =

Film by Fx Goby

- Directed by: Fx Goby
- Written by: Jack London
- Produced by: Samuel François-Steininger; Chris O'reilly; Charlotte Bavasso; Christel Delahaye
- Starring: Tony Fish
- Music by: Mathieu Alvado
- Release date: 25 May 2016 (Forum des images)
- Running time: 13 minutes
- Countries: France; United Kingdom
- Language: English

To Build a Fire (French: Construire un Feu) is a 2016 French animated short film directed by Fx Goby adapted from the 1902 and 1908 short story "To Build a Fire" by Jack London. The film has been presented in a number of festivals including the Cannes Film Festival, the Anibar International Animation Festival, the New Orleans Film Festival and the Rhode Island International Film Festival where it won the prize for best animation.

The film was partially funded through Indiegogo, an American crowdfunding platform.

== Premise ==
In the harshness of midwinter, an unnamed man attempts to travel across ten miles of Yukon wilderness to arrive at a camp where his friends are while bracing temperatures dropping to seventy-five degrees below zero with his companion, a wolf-dog. Struggling to survive, he makes multiple attempts to build a simple fire.

== Awards ==
- "Animation Grand Prize", Rhode Island International Film Festival 2016
- "Best International Animation", Shorts Mexico 2016
- "Special Accolade", Animaze Montreal Animation Film Festival 2016
- "Best Original Score", Fimucine Canary Island film festival 2016

The short was also included in The animation Showcase Best of the year 2016.
