= Fx Goby =

French director and illustrator

- Born: François-Xavier Goby; France
- Education: Supinfocom
- Occupations: Film director, illustrator
- Website: www.fxgoby.com

François-Xavier Goby is a French director and illustrator based in London.

== Biography ==
Fx Goby studied animation at Supinfocom, a pioneer school in computer animation in Valenciennes. He graduated in 2006 with a short animated film En Tus Brazos, co directed with Edouard Jouret and Matthieu Landour, that toured festivals around the world and won awards, including a SIGGRAPH 2007 Award of Excellence.

After living in Paris for three years, he moved to London joining Nexus Productions. He formed the directing duo Fx and Mat with university friend Matthieu Landour and directed several commercials and music videos including a Coca-Cola Super Bowl commercial in 2011. The duo split in 2012 to follow a solo career. His second short and first live action film, The Elaborate End of Robert Ebb, co directed with Clement Bolla and Matthieu Landour, won the Canal+ award at Clermont-Ferrand International Short Film Festival in 2012 and was subsequently purchased by the network. He directed many commercials since then, a short live action film Chiante (Pest) broadcast by Channel 4 and a feature documentary for France 3 about Prince Philip: Le Mari de la Reine, L’inconnu de Buckingham and also published a few books as an illustrator.

In June 2016, he released To Build a Fire, a cinematic adaptation in 2D animation of Jack London’s short novel. The film is touring festivals at the moment and won many awards including the Oscars qualifying Best Animation Grand Prize at the 2016 Rhode Island International Film Festival.

In 2018, he created, alongside co-director Hélène Leroux, the first ever Google Doodle in VR / 360 storytelling, a tribute to cinema pioneer Georges Méliès, in a film that encompassed his famous work such as A Trip to the Moon and The Impossible Voyage. The film has subsequently been nominated for an Emmy Awards in the 2018 Creative Arts Emmy Award category.

== Filmography ==
=== Short films ===
- En Tus Brazos (In Your Arms) (2006), animation, 4 min
- La Mystérieuse Disparition de Robert Ebb (The Elaborate End of Robert Ebb) (2011), 12:30 minutes
- Chiante (Pest) (2015), 2:30 minutes
- Construire un Feu (To Build a Fire) (2016), animation, 13 minutes

=== Music videos ===
- "Cassidy" by Erevan Tusk (2012), produced by Chez Eddy
- "Skies Turn Gold" by The Ramona Flowers (2016), produced by Nexus Productions
- "Cracker Island" by Gorillaz Feat. Thundercat (2022), produced by Nexus Studios
- "Silent Running" by Gorillaz Feat. Adeleye Omotayo (2023), produced by Nexus Studios

=== Commercials ===
- "Royal Bank of Canada" (2008)
- "OLYMPIC film for Vancouver" (2010)
- "Super Bowl Coca-Cola Siege" (2011)
- "Tropicana mornings" (2011)
- "Vodafone surprise" (2012)
- "vitaminwater" (2014)
- "Samsung WatchON" (2014)

=== Documentaries ===
- Le Mari de la Reine, L'inconnu de Buckingham (The Queen's Husband, Buckingham's Stranger) (2016), produced by AB Productions and France 3

== Illustrations in books ==
- "Méduses", written by Valentine Goby (Jérome Millon, 2003), ISBN 978-2-84137-260-7
- "Le livre qui rend heureux", written by Arthur Dreyfus (Flammarion, 2011), ISBN 978-2-0812-6633-9 (translated in Korean)
- "Le Mystère de Hawa'a", written by Valentine Goby (Éditions Albin Michel, 2013), ISBN 978-2-226-24597-7
