= Internationales Frauen* Film Fest Dortmund+Köln =

Annual film festival in Cologne, Germany

Internationales Frauen* Film Fest Dortmund+Köln (IFF Dortmund+Köln) is a German feminist film festival. It was created in 2006 by merging Feminale, Germany's oldest feminist film festival, held in Cologne, Feminale, and femme totale (held in Dortmund). Feminale was founded in 1983 by students of film theory from the University of Cologne.

The festival's location alternates between Cologne and Dortmund, two major cities in the German state of North Rhine-Westphalia, and it provides a platform for women filmmakers in all aspects of film production.

== History ==
=== Feminale ===
The first Feminale, the oldest German feminist film festival took place in 1984, organised by eight film students from the University of Cologne. At the time, the group included Esther Baron, Angelika Dötig, Karin Jurschick, Elke Kimmlinger, Katja Mildenberger, Biddy Pastor, Dagmar Röper and Astrid Völker. The impetus for the festival emerged from the students' observation that films made by women appeared less frequently in theaters and at festivals than films directed by men. As a result, the only requirement for submission was that the film be made by a woman.

The early Feminales showcased films and videos from the region. In 1986, films from Austria and Switzerland were also included in the program. By 1988, the program was opened to submissions from other European countries. With these changes, the Feminale became an international film festival, with European and Country Programs.

From the 1990s, the festival foregrounded the content and politics of the films shown - and thus the question of “feminist film".

=== Merger ===
In 2006, Feminale was merged with another women's film festival, femme totale, held in Dortmund, to create Internationales Frauen* Film Fest Dortmund+Köln.

=== IFF Dortmund+Köln ===
Before the 37th film festival was set to begin on 24 March 2020, the entire six-day event (99 films from 28 countries) was cancelled due to the coronavirus pandemic.

== Description ==
The location of the festival alternates between Cologne and Dortmund.

The festival provides a platform for showcasing the latest film developments and trends related to women working in all areas of film production. It highlights women film directors along with women cinematographers, composers and other women filmmakers.

== Awards ==
On an alternating biennial basis, the International Debut Feature Fiction Film Competition for young filmmakers and the National Competition for Women Directors of Photography, aimed at the next generation of camera women at German film schools, are awarded in Cologne. On an alternating biennial basis, the International Fiction Feature Film Award is given in Dortmund for women directors who have been active for many years. Every year, the film festival awards an Audience Award to a film that is least sixty minutes in length and completed within 24 months prior to the date of festival.

== See also ==
- List of women's film festivals
