= Babak Anvari =

British-Iranian filmmaker

- Anvari at the 2026 BFI London Film Festival
- Born: 1983 (age 42–43); Tehran, Iran
- Education: University of Westminster
- Occupations: Director; Writer; Producer
- Years active: c. 1999–present

Babak Anvari (Persian: بابک انوری; born 1983) is a British-Iranian filmmaker. He is best known for directing horror films such as Under the Shadow (2016) and Wounds (2019).

Anvari was nominated for Best Feature at the 2026 Gotham Film Awards as one of the producers of Your Mother Your Mother Your Mother.

== Early life ==
Anvari grew up in Tehran, Iran, with his older brother at the time of the Iran–Iraq War and the Iranian Cultural Revolution. He said in 2016, "We've both grown up with night terrors, being afraid of being left alone, of being in the dark for too long." At age 19 in 2002, Anvari moved to London, going on to graduate from the University of Westminster in 2005.

== Career ==
In 2016, Anvari made his directorial debut with the horror film Under the Shadow. It was submitted by the United Kingdom for an Oscar nomination. The film was nominated for six British Independent Film Awards and won three, and won the BAFTA Award for Outstanding Debut.

In 2019, Anvari's follow-up film Wounds, a horror film based on the novella The Visible Filth by Nathan Ballingrud, was released. The cast includes Armie Hammer, Dakota Johnson and Zazie Beetz, and it screened at the Sundance Film Festival.

Anvari was announced as the director of an upcoming Cloverfield film in September 2022. In November 2023, Anvari's film Hallow Road started production. The film's cast includes Rosamund Pike and Matthew Rhys.

== Personal life ==
Anvari lives in London.

In 2022, Anvari participated in the Sight & Sound film polls of that year. Anvari's selections were Close Encounters of the Third Kind, Batman Returns, Jurassic Park, Stalker, 2001: A Space Odyssey, Mulholland Dr., Beetlejuice, The Dark Knight, Heat and Se7en.

In October 2022, Anvari wrote an open letter urging the entertainment industry to "amplify the voice" of the Mahsa Amini protesters and "give hope to the youth of Iran that the world is listening to their chants for freedom."

== Filmography ==
Short film

Year	Title	Director	Writer	Producer
2005	What's Up with Adam?	Yes	No	No
2005	Creed	Yes	No	Yes
2007	Solitary	Yes	Yes	No
2011	Two & Two	Yes	Yes	Yes

Feature film

Year	Title	Director	Writer	Producer
2016	Under the Shadow	Yes	Yes	No
2019	Wounds	Yes	Yes	Yes
2022	I Came By	Yes	Yes	Co-producer
2025	Hallow Road	Yes	No	Executive
2026	Your Mother Your Mother Your Mother	No	No	Yes
TBA	Untitled Cloverfield film	Yes	No	No

TV series

Year	Title	Director	Executive Producer	Notes
2020	Monsterland	Yes	Yes	Director: "Newark, NJ"
