= Mania Akbari =

Iranian filmmaker

Mania Akbari مانيا اكبری
- Born: 1974 (age 51–52); Tehran, Iran
- Occupations: Film director, screenwriter, artist, writer
- Years active: 1991–present
- Children: 2, including Amina

Mania Akbari (Persian: مانيا اکبری, born 1974) is an Iranian filmmaker, artist, writer, and curator whose works explore women's rights, marriage, sexual identity, disease and body image. Her style, in contrast to the long tradition of melodrama in Iranian cinema, is rooted in the visual arts and autobiography. Because of the taboo themes frankly discussed in her films and her opposition to censorship, she is considered one of the most controversial filmmakers in Iran.

From 2007 to 2010, Akbari worked on numerous photography-based works that were featured in various galleries around the world, while she kept making documentary and fiction films until 2011, when during production of her film, From Tehran to London, members of her crew were arrested by Iranian authorities for filming without official permission. Scared she too might be imprisoned, Akbari fled Tehran for London.

Since settling in London, various international retrospectives of Akbari's films have drawn attention to her cinema, among which retrospectives at the BFI, the Oldenburg International Film Festival and the Danish Film Institute are the most notable.

Mania Akbari founded the online art platform Cryptofiction in 2020.

== Early life and education ==
Mania Akbari was born in 1974 in Tehran, Iran.

== Career ==
Akbari's artistic activities, as a painter, started in 1991 when she took part in various exhibitions in Iran, as well as abroad. She was later exposed to cinema, working as a cinematographer and assistant director on documentary films.

Akbari's first work in the film industry was with documentarian Mahvash Sheikholeslami. In 2002, Akbari and her daughter, Amina Maher, and her sister, Roya Akbari, appeared in the docufiction Ten. The film was released with Abbas Kiarostami as the credited director, but Akbari has since asserted that she shot the footage and Kiarostami only edited it. The following year, Akbari directed her debut film, a short documentary called Crystal. In 2004, she wrote, acted in and directed her first feature-length film, 20 Fingers, which won best film in the Venice Film Festival's Digital Cinema section.

Akbari's first feature-length film 20 Fingers (2004), a study of marriage and sexual identity, was screened in more than 40 film festivals around the world.

Between 2004 and 2007, she made six video art pieces entitled Self, Repression, Sin, Escape, Fear, and Destruction, which were shown in numerous film festivals such as Locarno Film Festival and exhibited at museums such as the Tate Modern.

In 2007, Akbari was diagnosed with an aggressive form of breast cancer and the film she made that year, 10+4, explores the sensation of living "with both life and death." Akbari calls her second feature film a sequel of sorts to Ten. It was exhibited at numerous festivals such as the San Sebastián International Film Festival and the Cannes Film Festival. This film has also been screened in many international museums such as the Centre Georges Pompidou and Museum of Fine Arts, Boston.

In 2010, Akbari made a documentary about capital punishment and the execution of Behnoud Shojaee, titled 30 Minutes To 6. Although after the disputed 2009 election, the filmmaking conditions in Iran were becoming more closed and controlled, she decided to make One. Two. One, her third feature-length film, there. In the same year, she started working on her next film, originally to have been called "Women Do Not Have Breasts". During the making of this film, numerous filmmakers were arrested in Iran, and since she opposed the State-imposed limitations on expression, she left Iran for London and finished the film under the new title of From Tehran to London.

In 2014, Akbari made an essay film entitled Life May Be with British filmmaker and film historian Mark Cousins. This film was screened in several film festivals around the world such as the Karlovy Vary International Film Festival and the Edinburgh International Film Festival.

In 2019, Akbari released a second epistolary essay film, A Moon for My Father, co-directed with the sculptor Douglas White, which one critic praised as "a form of digressive-poetic cinema, connecting images and ideas in a dream-associative logic".

Akbari directed Dear Elnaz (2020), a documentary about a person who was killed as a passenger on Ukraine International Airlines Flight 752.

Akbari made the film How Dare You Have Such a Rubbish Wish, released in 2022, with clips of women in Iranian popular cinema from before the revolution.

Akbari has also curated several film programs.

== Cinematic style ==
Akbari's filmmaking style consists of long takes, hand-held camera and almost painterly control of colour which is called "a cross between fiction and documentary." In an interview, Akbari pointed to "architecture and mise-en-scène within a space" as the most important elements in her filmmaking. "When I'm creating my frame, I really want it so that when each frame is seen the audience can imagine the space surrounding it themselves. The way that I'm creating the mise-en-scène within each frame, I'm trying to, every second, break the theatrical boundaries that people are seeing. In my view, I actually feel that it's more like performance art than a theatrical performance. It's as if I create a space for every single character and they come and perform within that space and share something with their audience, and then they leave."

== Reception ==
Akbari's work has been described as "remarkably fresh, audacious and relevant." The Guardian has noted that her feature films are "rivetingly human: pitiless, potent studies of domestic strife, and of the fight for happiness – and domination – in sexual relationships."

== Favourite films ==
In 2022, Akbari participated in the Sight & Sound film polls of that year. It is held every ten years to select the greatest films of all time, by asking contemporary directors to select ten films of their choice.

Akbari's selections were:

- Yek ettefāq-e sāde (1973)
- Ṭabiʿat-e bijān (1974)
- Sans Soleil (1983)
- Cléo from 5 to 7 (1962)
- No Home Movie (2015)
- 4 Months, 3 Weeks and 2 Days (2007)
- What Do Men Want? (1921)
- Sieranevada (2016)
- Girl of Mystery (1914)
- Disque 957 (1996)

== Awards ==
- Winner of the best feature film in Venezia Cinema Digital Section for 20 Fingers.
- The grand jury prize for the spirit of freedom at the Bahamas International Film Festival.
- Best director and best actress prizes for 20 Fingers at the Digital International Barcelona Film Festival.
- Winner of the Most Innovative film Award for 20 Fingers at the Wine Country International Film Festival.
- Winner of the best film and best director awards for 10+4 at the Kerala International Film Festival.
- Winner of the best film for 10+4 in L'Alternativa, Festival de Cinema Independent de Barcelona.
- Winner of the Don Quixote Award for Life May Be at the Fribourg International Film Festival.
- Winner of the FIPRESCI prize for A Moon for My Father at the Ankara Flying Broom International Women's Film Festival.
- Winner of NEW:VISION award for A Moon for My Father at CPH:DOX in 2019.

== Filmography ==
- Crystal (2003)
- 20 Fingers (2004)
- 10 + 4 (2007)
- One. Two. One. (2011)
- 30 minutes to 6 (2011)
- From Tehran to London (2012)
- Life May Be (2014) (co-directed with Mark Cousins)
- A Moon for My Father (2019) (co-directed with Douglas White)
- Dear Elnaz (2020)
- How Dare You Have Such a Rubbish Wish (2022)

== Video arts ==
- Repression (2004)
- Sin (2004)
- Escape (2004)
- Fear (2004)
- Devastation (2004)
- I slept with my mother, father, brother and sister in the country called Iran (2012)
- In My Country Men Have Breasts (2012)

== Exhibitions ==
=== Video Arts ===
- Kakhe Niyavaran/ Niavaran Palace Gallery - gallery (Tehran, Iran - 2004)
- Locarno International Film Festival – special screening (Locarno, Switzerland - August 2005)
- 15th Videobrasil (São Paulo, Brazil - 2005)
- City of Women International Film Festival of Contemporary Arts ( Ljubljana, Slovenia - 2005)
- Peru International Film Festival - screening (Lima, Peru - 2005)
- Salento International Film Festival - screening (Salento, Italy - 2005)
- Rochester-High Falls International Film Festival - exhibition (Rochester, NY, USA - 2005)
- Gijón International Film Festival - exhibition (Gijon, Spain - 2005)
- Iranian Group Exhibition (Rome, Italy - 2006)
- Tate Modern at Tate Museum - screening of Video Art - Self(2007) (London, UK - 2007)
- Xerxes Art Gallery (London, UK - 2008)
- Caledonia Festival - screening (Udine, Italy - March 2009)
- The Royal College of Art - screening of Video Arts Self and Sin (London, UK - October 2009)

=== Art works ===
- Tarahan Azad Gallery (Tehran, Iran - 2008)
- 10 Gallery (Tehran, Iran - 2008)
- Tarahan Azad Gallery (Tehran, Iran - 2009)
- Magic of Persia's Auction (Dubai, UAE - 2009)
- Mellat Gallery (Tehran, Iran - 2009)
- Phillips de Pury & Company Auction (London, UK - 2009)
- Pierre cornette de saint cyr (Paris, France - 2009)
- The Night (2023)
