= Olivier Magis =

Belgian director (born 1978)

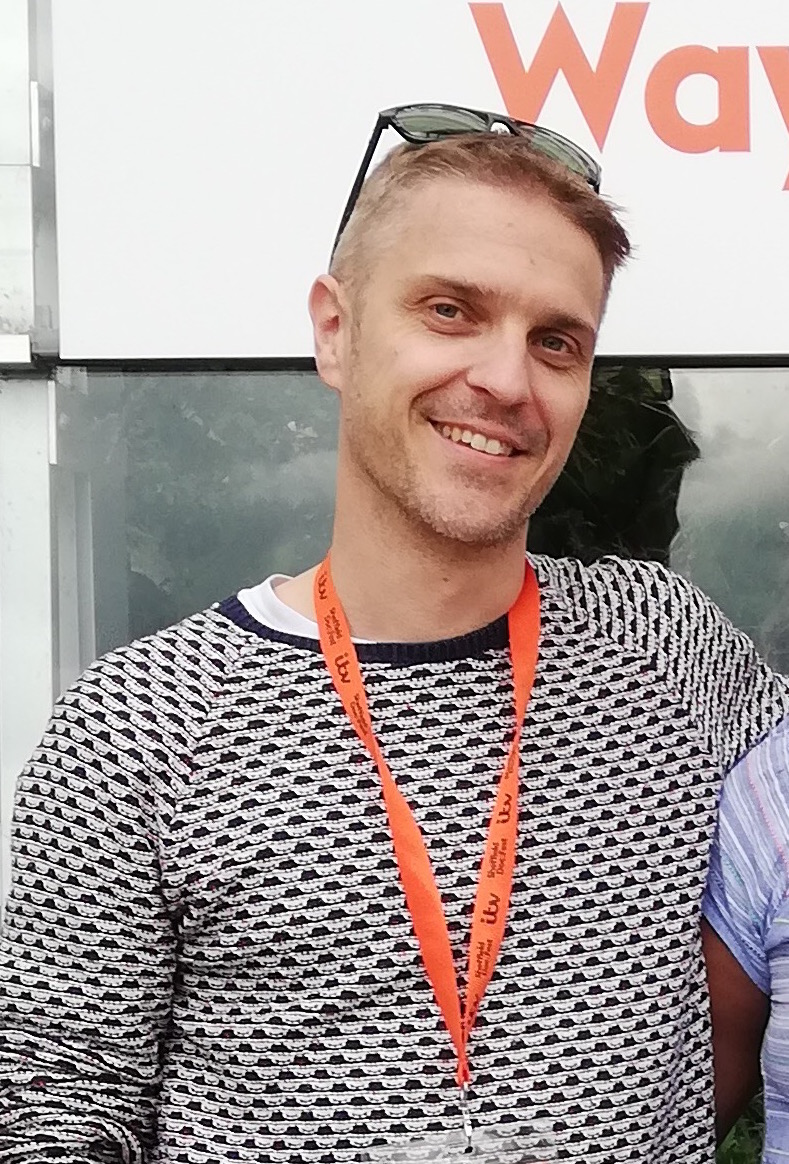
Olivier Magis

Olivier Magis (born 28 February 1978) is a Belgian director of several award-winning documentaries.

== Biography ==
Magis graduated in directing at the Institut des Arts de Diffusion after directing his final film Le Secret des Dieux, in 2004. This short film, a mockumentary, uses the mad cow scandal as a pretext for an investigative narrative, in order to question the critical relationship between viewers and the media. According to Muriel Andrin, Professor of Writing and Film Analysis at the Université Libre de Bruxelles, "Magis kidnaps television images in favour of another story, a fake documentary, a docu-fiction, following in the footsteps of Peter Watkins or William Karel, on the thin line where reality meets imagination.".

Between 2005 and 2006, he worked as a director at Alterface Projects and wrote and directed films for the interactive educational game "Future Dome " for the scientific center Our Dynamic Earth in Edinburgh.

At the same time, he works as an assistant stage director. In 2007, he assisted Nele Paxinou in the travelling troupe of the Baladins du Miroir, during the creation of the adaptation of Tristan and Iseult, written by Paul Emond. In 2011, he goes on to assist Olivier Antoine on the graduation show "Aphasia" at the École supérieure des arts du cirque, in Brussels. In 2011, he assists director Sofia Betz in the creation of the play "De la nécessité des grenouilles", written by Virginie Thirion, at Atelier 210.

In 2013, he directed his first creative documentary, Ion, produced by Dérives (Dardenne brothers and Julie Frères). This film tells the story of Ion Beleaua, a visually impaired former political refugee, who works as a police auxiliary in Liège. Broadcast on Belgian television and awarded in numerous international festivals, the documentary also received the Special Mention at the SCAM Discovery Prizes, audiovisual section

In 2014 he directed Les Fleurs de l'Ombre, a documentary diving into Romania, in a Miss competition for visually impaired women. This competition organized by the Romanian Association of the Blind is not ordinary, however: it rewards the inner beauty of the participants. In 2015, the film won the Best Documentary (ex-aequo) Award at the South East European Film Festival in Los Angeles.

In 2015, he directed two episodes of the Babel Express television documentary collection, broadcast on ARTE and RTBF.

The following year, he collaborated on the documentary trilogy Archibelge!, a television series questioning the ugliness of architecture in Belgium. Drawing up "an absurd and surreal panorama of Belgian architecture", this trilogy was broadcast on the Belgian national channels RTBF and CANVAS "tells our country through its architecture, its urban planning and through the eyes of those who live there". Magis directed the first episode, entitled "Brussels, or the quest for identity", and questioned the complex roots of the urban and architectural problems in Brussels.

His first short fiction film, May Day, co-directed with Fedrik De Beul, was released in 2017. This film plunges the viewer into the heart of a job strangely put up for auction. Broadcast on RTBF, BeTV, CANVAS, Canal+, TV5 Monde, May Day is rewarded at many international festivals. It is also shortlisted for the Oscars 2019.

== Filmography ==
- 2004 : Le Secret des Dieux (short mockumetary)
- 2013 : Ion (documentary)
- 2014 : Les Fleurs de l'ombre (documentary)
- 2015 : Babel Express (documentary TV series)
- 2015 : Archibelge-Bruxelles (documentary TV series)
- 2017 : May Day, co-directed with Fedrik De Beul (short fiction film)

== Awards ==
- Overall Grand Prix at the Festival International du film indépendant de Bruxelles for Le Secret des Dieux.
- Grand Prix and Audience Award at the Festival du Court–Métrage HEC, Jouy-en-Josas (France) for Le Secret des Dieux.
- Authors’ Prize of the SACD-SCAM at Festival Media 10/10, Namur, 2004
- Prix des Lycéens (ex-aequo) at Festival du Film de Saint-Benoît de la Réunion, 2005
- Screenplay Award at Festival « Le Court en dit Long », Paris, 2005.
- Award for Best First Professional Film at the Documentary Film Festival « Traces de Vies » pour Ion, Clermont-Ferrand/Vic-le-Comte, 2013.
- Jury Award and Audience Award at the Festival International du Film Documentaire "Aux écrans du réel" for Ion, Le Mans, 2013.
- Grand Prix at the Festival du Film Cinéma et Sciences - A Nous de Voir, Oullins, 2014.
- Grand Prix Best Documentary at the International Disability Film Festival "Breaking down barriers" for Ion, Moscou, 2016.
- Special Mention at Prix SCAM Audiovisuel - Discovery for Ion, Paris, 2015.
- Best Documentary Award (ex-aequo) at the South East European Film Festival for « Les Fleurs de l'Ombre » (« Flowers in the Shadows »), Los Angeles, 2015.
- Grand Prix Best Short Film at the WIFF - Warsaw International Film Festival for May Day, Warsaw 2017.
- Special Jury Award at the Asiana International Short Film Festival for May Day, Seoul 2017.
- Jury Award, Audience Award, Best Actor Award and Special Mention of the Press at the Leuven International Short Film Festival (Flemish competition), for May Day, Leuven 2017.
- Best Screenplay Award & Prix des festivals Connexion-Auverge-Rhône-Alpes at the Festival du Film Court de Villeurbanne for May Day, 2017.
- Best Foreign Language Short Film at the NYC Short Film Festival, New-York for May Day, 2018.
- Jury Award and Audience Award at the International Film Festival "Courts d'un soir" for May Day, Montréal, 2018.
- Prix de la Nuit du court métrage engagé for May Day at the Festival International du Film d'Aubagne, 2018.
- Best Narrative Short Fiction Award for May Day at the São Paulo Film Festival 2018
