= Rubika (school) =

Design school in France and India

Rubika is a school founded in 1988 in Valenciennes, France. It specializes in 2D/3D animation, video games and industrial design. It is a consortium of institutes including ISD Rubika, Supinfocom and Supinfogame. Rubika has campuses in France, India and Canada. It has about 1200 students.

== ISD Rubika ==
ISD Rubika
- Type: Private
- Established: 1987; 39 years ago
- Location: (France) Valenciennes; (India) Pune
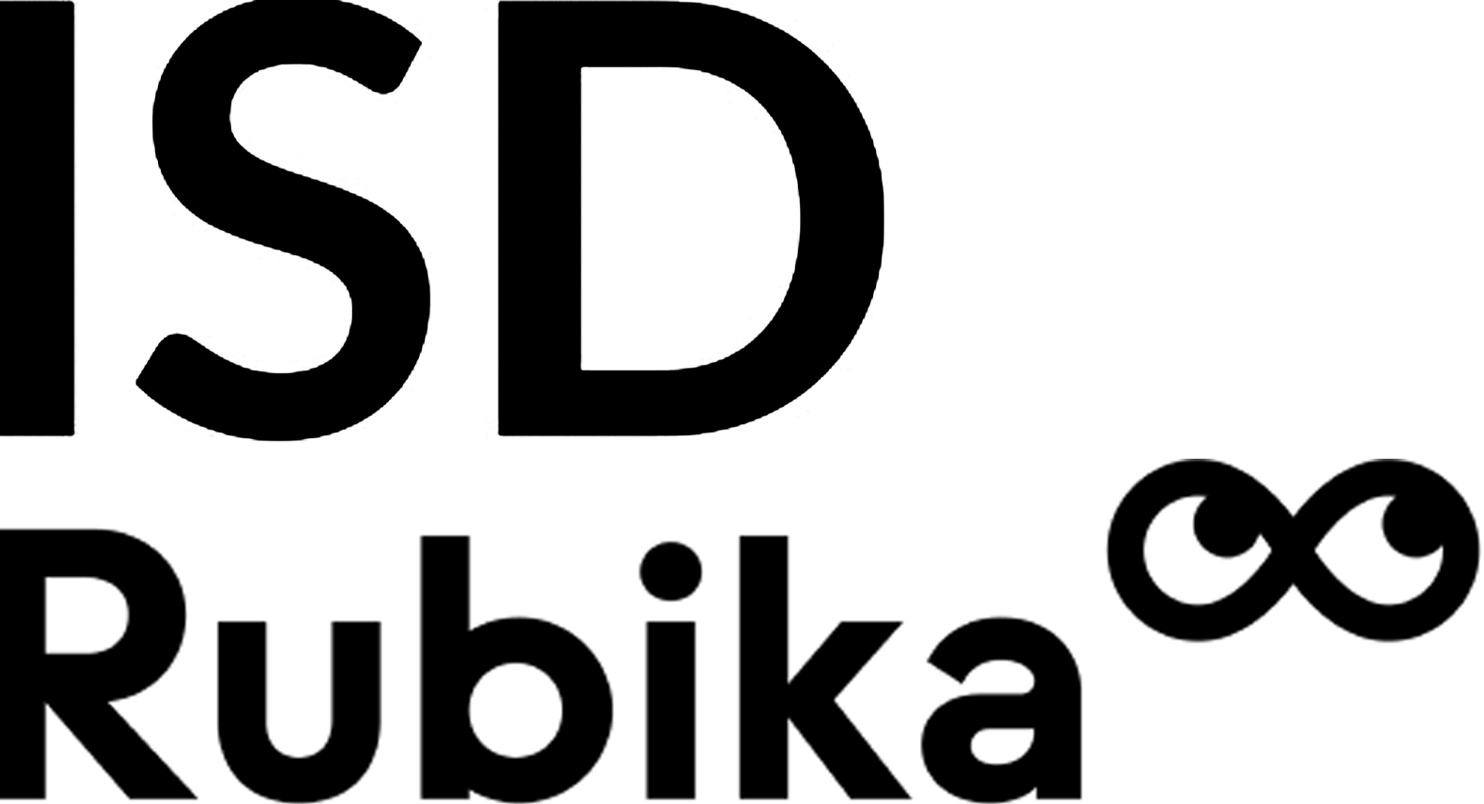

Institut Supérieur du Design (ISD) Rubika is a French school of design located at two sites, in Valenciennes (France) and in Pune (India). It was founded by the Chamber of Commerce and Industry of Grand Hainaut in 1987. It offers professional certificates in Management in Engineering Design, Product Design and transports design in five years.

=== History ===
ISD Rubika was founded in 1987 at Valenciennes, aiming to train designers to work in manufacturing and mass retail companies.

Since 1987, ISD is a member of ACM SIGGRAPH.

=== Research ===
ISD's Research-Transfer-Innovation unit conducts about 50 applied research projects every year with industrial, commercial and scientific partners. The other field of applied research concerns engineering pedagogy, developed on the basis of industrial forecasting, the evolution of tools and methods of product conception and mobility systems for goods and passengers. ISD has a ‘laboratory collaboration’ agreement with the Engineering Pedagogy lab of the ISEN Group.

== Supinfocom ==
Supinfocom
- Established: 1988; 38 years ago
- Location: (France) Valenciennes, Arles; (India) Pune
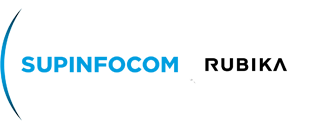

Supinfocom (French: école SUPérieure d'INFOrmatique de COMmunication, roughly University of Communication Science) is a computer graphics university with campuses in Valenciennes, Arles (France) and Pune (India).

Founded in 1988 in Valenciennes, the school offers a five-year course leading to a diploma of digital direction (certified Level I). A second campus in Arles opened in 2000, while a third one opened in 2008 in Pune, India. In November 2007, the school was ranked #1 worldwide by the American magazine "3D World" with criteria such as the distribution of student films and prizes in festivals around the world.

The curriculum includes:

- Two years of preparatory courses (design and applied art, perspective, film analysis, video, color, 2D animation, art history, sculpture, communication, English);
- Three years of specialization in computer graphics (3D software, screenplay, storyboards, animation, compositing, 3D production, sound, editing).

The final year of study is devoted to the team-based production of a short film in CG. Until the class of 2007 entered, there were only two years of specialization courses; there are now three.

== Supinfogame ==
Supinfogame Rubika
- Type: Consular
- Established: 2001; 25 years ago
- Director: Stéphane André
- Location: (France) Valenciennes; (India) Pune; (Canada) Montréal
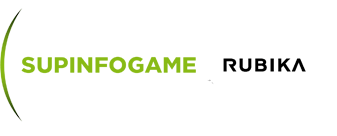

Supinfogame is the first French school fully dedicated to the videogame industry. Located in Valenciennes, it is one of the three schools of Rubika. Based on a chamber of commerce initiative and launched in 2001, Supinfogame trains students in game design, game art, management and game programming.

Each year, 40 baccalaureate laureates pass the test to start the 3-year first Cycle, in Management/Game Design or Management/Game Art Section. The second cycle is open to candidates with an HND level (equivalent to a Bac+2 or Bac+3). The number of students in the Second cycle is 25 places for Management/Game Design, 20 places for Management/Game Art and 16 for Management/Programming.

The diploma delivered is recognized by the French Government and its title is : Videogame Director. It is a Bac+5 diploma. The school is also supported by the SELL, the SNJV and by the European Union as part of ESF and ERDF.

=== Supinfogame and the videogame industry ===
Since its beginning, Supinfogame has built its educational content with the help of professionals. In France and abroad, videogame companies (both developers and publishers) trust SUPINFOGAME's pedagogy and therefore offer internships and positions to students in France and worldwide (Ubisoft, 2K Czech, Arkane Studios, Electronic Arts, Gameloft, Eden Games, Ankama).

Thus, many students and graduates appear in the credits of significant published games like: Dishonored, Assassin's Creed, Crysis 2, Tom Clancy's Ghost Recon: Future Soldier, Far Cry 3, Splinter Cell Double Agent, Rayman Raving Rabbids, Star Wars: Lethal Alliance and so on.

=== Awards ===
- In 2011 : SACD AWARDS for Best Student Game for Hollywood Zombie Pinball Apocalypse
- In 2011 : MICROSOFT, IMAGINE CUP: World Gold Medal for Game Design on Mobile for Brainergy
- In 2010 : UNITY AWARDS for Best Visual Design for the Uncanny Fish Hunt.
- In 2009 : IMAGINA AWARDS for Alice en Pièces.

=== International partnerships ===
- In 2007 a MoU was signed between Supinfogame and the Nanyang Polytechnic of Singapore for student's exchanges.
- The same year, the Indian group D.S.Kulkarni call upon SUPINFOCOM GROUP to expand their know-how. In 2008 Supinfogame, Supinfocom and the ISD launched their pedagogy on the international campus of Pune, in India.
- 20.0% of our 200 alumni work in foreign countries: in the USA (New York City and San Francisco), in Canada (Montreal and Toronto), in China (Shanghai), in Korea (Seoul).

=== Career prospects ===
Supinfogame offers a wide range of careers: game designer, level designer, production assistant, project manager, 2D/3D, 2D/3D animator, character designer, and screenplay writer.

Out of 200 diplomaed students, 98.0% actually work in the Gaming Industry.

== See also ==
- Category:Supinfocom alumni
