= List of Mr. Bean episodes =

This is an episode guide for the British television series Mr. Bean, starring Rowan Atkinson as the title character, which ran between 1 January 1990 and 15 November 1995. Also listed are other live and guest appearances of Mr. Bean in television broadcasts, a number of short sketches for Comic Relief and various commercials, music videos and YouTube videos.

== Episodes ==
No.	Title	Directed by	Written by	Original release date
1	"Mr. Bean"	John Howard Davies	Ben Elton, Richard Curtis and Rowan Atkinson	1 January 1990
Mr. Bean attends a mathematics exam, during which he tries to copy from a student (Paul Bown) under the nose of the invigilator (Rudolph Walker). Afterwards, he surreptitiously changes into his swimming trunks so as not to be noticed by someone sitting nearby at a beach (Roger Sloman) and later struggles to stay awake during a church service and obnoxiously sings the refrain of the hymn "All Creatures of Our God and King," much to the annoyance of the man sitting next to him, Mr. Sprout (Richard Briers).
2	"The Return of Mr. Bean"	John Howard Davies	Richard Curtis, Robin Driscoll and Rowan Atkinson	5 November 1990
Mr. Bean tries out his new American Express charge card at a department store, he visits a fancy restaurant for his birthday and is served an unwanted dish, leading him to try a variety of strategies to avoid eating it, and then has an unfortunate altercation with Queen Elizabeth The Queen Mother.
3	"The Curse of Mr. Bean"	John Howard Davies	Richard Curtis, Robin Driscoll and Rowan Atkinson	1 January 1991
Mr. Bean visits the local swimming pool where he realises that he is scared of heights after climbing to the top of the diving board, tries to find a way to leave the car park without paying, makes a sandwich in the park sitting next to a man (Angus Deayton), jumps a traffic light in his car by getting out and pushing it, and then joins his girlfriend (Matilda Ziegler) to watch a horror film at the cinema.
4	"Mr. Bean Goes to Town"	Paul Weiland and John Birkin	Richard Curtis, Robin Driscoll and Rowan Atkinson	15 October 1991
Bean buys a new portable television, but has difficulty getting good reception. At the park, he has his camera stolen and later finds a unique way of identifying the culprit (Nick Hancock). After leaving his shoe on top of a car, Bean hops around town to retrieve it and later takes his girlfriend to see a magic show and go clubbing one night.
5	"The Trouble with Mr. Bean"	Paul Weiland and John Birkin	Richard Curtis, Robin Driscoll and Rowan Atkinson	1 January 1992
Bean wakes up late for his dental appointment, forcing him to drive to the clinic whilst getting dressed and brushing his teeth. At the clinic, his appointment progresses badly after he accidentally sedates the dentist (Richard Wilson), forcing him to finish the dental procedure himself. He then heads to the park to have a peaceful picnic by himself, but is then attacked by wasps.
6	"Mr. Bean Rides Again"	Paul Weiland and John Birkin	Richard Curtis, Robin Driscoll and Rowan Atkinson	17 February 1992
On his way to post a letter, Bean attempts to save a man suffering from a heart attack, but when the ambulance arrives, Bean uses it to jump start his Mini's dead battery, inadvertently disabling the ambulance. After accidentally getting himself locked inside a pillar box whilst posting his letter, Bean packs for a holiday, suffers from a noisy laughing man (Stephen Frost) during a train ride and then attempts to entertain a sick boy on a plane.
7	"Merry Christmas, Mr. Bean"	John Birkin	Richard Curtis, Robin Driscoll and Rowan Atkinson	29 December 1992
On Christmas Eve, Bean heads to town to do Christmas shopping, during which he plays with a Nativity scene at Harrods and later inadvertently conducts a Salvation Army band at the town market. On Christmas Day, he attempts to cook a turkey, during which he accidentally gets his head stuck inside it, and later relaxes for a reserved Christmas meal with his girlfriend.
8	"Mr. Bean in Room 426"	Paul Weiland	Robin Driscoll and Rowan Atkinson	17 February 1993
Bean treats himself to a bank holiday weekend at the Queen's Hotel, where he seeks competition with his hotel neighbour involving accommodation and dining. After he eats some spoiled oysters for dinner by accident, he has a nightmare about them and his neighbour. With his stomach turning, he goes outside of his room naked to complain to his other neighbour who is playing very loud music, but accidentally gets himself locked out, prompting him to try sneaking back into his room without being seen. Guest star: Danny La Rue
9	"Do-It-Yourself Mr. Bean"	John Birkin	Robin Driscoll and Rowan Atkinson	10 January 1994
On New Year's Eve 1993, Bean hosts his very own party with his best friends Rupert and Hubert, but it isn't long before his guests discover that there is more fun at the party next door and trick Bean into letting them go. The following morning on New Year's Day, Bean buys some new tools and a large recliner armchair at the January sales of a department store and has a unique way of driving them home, then tries painting his flat himself and starts off the new year with a bang.
10	"Mind the Baby, Mr. Bean"	Paul Weiland	Robin Driscoll and Rowan Atkinson	25 April 1994
On his way to the Southsea funfair, Bean accidentally becomes lumbered with a baby boy with no idea of how or where he came from, forcing him to try having fun at the fair with the baby. Throughout the day, the baby manages to survive Bean's unique style of mishaps before eventually being reunited with his mother.
11	"Back to School Mr. Bean"	John Birkin	Robin Driscoll and Rowan Atkinson	26 October 1994
Bean attends an open day of a local school, where he unleashes his usual brand of chaos in the various classes he visits. Afterwards, Bean's day soon takes a sombre turn when he finds that his Mini isn't parked where he left it and is crushed by a tank during the demonstration.
12	"Tee Off, Mr. Bean"	John Birkin	Robin Driscoll and Rowan Atkinson	20 September 1995
After causing chaos at the town launderette while having his laundry cleaned, Bean tries his hand at mini golf, but after being told by the course's owner that he can only touch the ball with the club and not with his hands, Bean's poor aim leads him on an elaborate tour around town before ultimately returning to the course several hours later with a final score of 3,427 strokes.
13	"Goodnight Mr. Bean"	John Birkin	Robin Driscoll and Rowan Atkinson	31 October 1995
At a hospital waiting room, Bean tries to find a way to jump the queue at A&E due to his impatience. Later at a park, he tries to get his camera to automatically take a picture of him standing next to a Queen's Guard, all the while taking advantage of the guard's duty to remain still by doing all he can to comically alter his appearance. At the end of the day, Bean tries to cure his insomnia with some unusual methods at home.
14	"Hair by Mr. Bean of London"	John Birkin	Robin Driscoll and Rowan Atkinson	15 November 1995 (Note: direct-to-video (until 2006))
At a barbershop, Bean inadvertently holds the fort for the barber when he is distracted by an important phonecall, resulting in him giving several customers terrible haircuts. Later, Bean heads to a fête, where he cheats at all the games and enters Teddy into a children's pet show, where his inanimacy allows Bean to pass all the obedience tests with flying colours. After a train journey, Bean accidentally loses his ticket and unsuccessfully sneaks out past the station's guard (Robin Driscoll) inside a mail bag.

== Films ==
No.	Title	Directed by	Written by	Original release date
1	Bean	Mel Smith	Richard Curtis and Robin Driscoll	1 August 1997
Mr. Bean works as a hopeless security guard at the Royal National Gallery in London and is then sent to the Grierson Art Gallery in California to talk about the unveiling of the painting Whistler's Mother.
2	Mr. Bean's Holiday	Steve Bendelack	Simon McBurney (story); Hamish McColl and Robin Driscoll (screenplay)	30 March 2007
During a rainy day in London, Bean heads to a church raffle where he wins his prize, a holiday to Cannes, France. During his journey through France, he is mistaken for both a kidnapper and an award-winning filmmaker when he arrives with both a Russian director's son and an aspiring pretty actress in tow.

== Other appearances ==
=== Unaired sketches ===
These sketches are included on some video releases:

No.	Title	Directed by	Written by	Original release date
1	"The Library"	Unknown	Unknown	4 November 1991
Mr. Bean visits a rare book library, where he reads a rare tome that must be handled with gloves. While using a pencil and a crayon to copy an illustration from the book by shading on a piece of tracing paper, he sneezes and the tracing paper slips away. He does not notice this, and continues to go about shading, but directly onto the book instead of the tracing paper. Upon eventually realising this, he attempts to remove the crayon marks – first by erasing, and then by using correction fluid, which only adds to the problem when it spreads to the opposite page after Bean shuts the book to a passing librarian. Eventually, he resorts to tearing out the pages he has ruined. Bean then proceeds to use a box-cutter knife to neaten up the stubs of the pages he has torn out, but in doing so inadvertently cuts other pages, causing the book to fall apart. Bean's final solution is to swap his book with that of someone else at his table; he almost succeeds, but when he returns to retrieve his bookmark from his original book, he is subsequently caught red-handed. Guest stars: Paul Brooke and Rex Doyle
2	"The Bus Stop"	Unknown	Unknown	4 November 1991
Mr. Bean waits at a bus stop behind a man; when the bus arrives, the man gets on, but the driver turns Bean away as the bus is full. Determined to be the first in line for the next bus, Bean tries to cut ahead of a woman (Matilda Ziegler) with a baby carriage who gets in line ahead of Bean when he steps away for a moment, and a blind man (Robin Driscoll) who pushes in without knowing. Soon after Bean manages to get to the front, several people join the end of the line, and the bus arrives. But the bus does not stop in front of Bean, it drives on for another few yards – just far enough that the entrance of the bus, which is at the back (unlike the previous bus, whose entrance was at the front) is in line with the end of the queue, in effect reversing the order of the queue so that Bean is left at the back, and again Bean is left behind as the bus fills up.

=== Clip Show Special ===
The compilation special was first released as a VHS-exclusive by Thames Video in 1996.

No.	Title	Directed by	Written by	Original release date
1	"The Best Bits of Mr. Bean"	John Howard Davies	Rowan Atkinson, Richard Curtis, Robin Driscoll and Ben Elton	21 October 1996
During a rainy day, Bean ventures into his loft to find an umbrella. As he shifts through his stored items, he begins to reminisce his past adventures, including his dental appointment, the church service, and the time his Mini was crushed by a tank.

=== Extended scenes ===
The following scenes from episodes 7, 9, and 11 are not seen in the original broadcasts of their respective episodes, but were included in the American broadcasts on HBO and later on PBS. They were likely added to the HBO broadcast to lengthen the running time. These scenes are also seen on some early VHS releases of the show in the United States.

No.	Title	Directed by	Written by	Original release date
1	"Turkey Weight (from "Merry Christmas, Mr. Bean")"	John Birkin	Richard Curtis, Robin Driscoll and Rowan Atkinson	TBA
This extended scene explains how Bean obtained the turkey he eventually ended up wearing on his head. Bean heads to a contest titled "Guess the Weight", in which one must guess the exact weight of the turkey in order to win it. While waiting his turn, Bean sneaks a pair of scales to the counter; having already weighed himself, he subtracts his weight from the combined weight using a calculator and the person in charge of the contest becomes shocked when Bean guesses the turkey's exact weight to three decimal places and gives him the turkey, which is then placed in the boot of Bean's Mini.
2	"The Chair (from Do-It-Yourself Mr. Bean)"	John Birkin	Robin Driscoll and Rowan Atkinson	TBA
An extended scene in which Mr. Bean is shopping at the department store for the January sales, when he sees a chair that he wishes to purchase. Upon approaching the reclining chair, he discovers that a sales assistant is already demonstrating its features to an elderly couple, prompting Bean to try fooling them into thinking it's broken: he unplugs it, which is almost immediately noticed by the assistant. While the elderly woman enjoys the chair, Bean secretly tampers with wires in its control panel. As she tries out the reclining feature, it folds over and sandwiches her in the middle. As she yells to her hearing-impaired husband for help (but is unheard despite being only a couple of metres away), Bean turns up the music playing on the store's intercom to make it harder for her to be heard, and she ultimately falls backward.
3	"Marching (from Back to School Mr. Bean)"	John Birkin	Robin Driscoll and Rowan Atkinson	TBA
Mr. Bean is ready to go inside, but suddenly, an army of men are marching to him. He tries to escape through a door, but it is looked. He asks a person inside to help him, just as the army men are almost at Mr. Bean they turn around and march away. Then Mr. Bean walks off too, and tells the person at the door everything is ok and now he doesn't need help.
4	"Playing With Matches (from Back to School Mr. Bean)"	John Birkin	Robin Driscoll and Rowan Atkinson	TBA
Someone is putting glue on matches for a display. Mr. Bean hands him a match, but it is on fire. The guy quickly blows it out, as Mr. Bean runs away.

=== Remake sketches ===
In November 1991, it was announced 20th Century Fox had a feature film adaptation of Mr. Bean in development. They remade two Mr. Bean sketches into short films: Mr. Bean Takes an Exam and Mr. Bean Goes to a Première and attached them to their theatrical releases.

No.	Title	Directed by	Written by	Original release date
1	"Mr. Bean Takes an Exam"	Paul Weiland	Rowan Atkinson, Richard Curtis and Ben Elton	1991
Remake of The Exam. Guest stars: John McGlynn and John Savident
2	"Mr. Bean Goes to a Première"	Paul Weiland	Rowan Atkinson, Richard Curtis and Robin Driscoll	1991
Remake of The Royal Premiere.

=== Comic Relief ===
A number of short sketches featuring Bean have also been produced for the Comic Relief telethon. The first three were included on a VHS release entitled "Comic Relief – Pick of the Nose", released in 1997 on BBC Video. "Mr. Bean's Wedding" was released on the DVD release "Mr. Bean – The Complete Collection".

No.	Title	Directed by	Written by	Original release date
1	"Mr. Bean's Red Nose Day"	Unknown	Robin Driscoll and Rowan Atkinson	15 March 1991
Bean is in a police station because his car has been broken into. He wears a red nose and has other red nose items, including a mug and a codpiece. He reveals to the policewoman (Matilda Ziegler), through the use of written signs, that he is doing a sponsored silence, sponsored tea drinking, sponsored codpiece wearing, and sponsored Madonna impression – presumably to raise money for Red Nose Day charities. When the policewoman is out of the room, Bean answers the phone but the caller hangs up since Bean hardly even speaks. Bean then dons a blonde wig and, upon the policewoman's return, reveals his sponsored Madonna impression. The policewoman proceeds to interview Bean about the robbery, which he answers in mime. The policewoman appears to enjoy herself as if playing a game of charades. After the interview, the policewoman asks until when Bean must stay silent. He has only two minutes remaining. She offers to sponsor him twenty pounds if he makes it through. The generous offer prompts him to respond with an excited, "Oh, thank you!" – breaking his silence.
2	"Blind Date"	Unknown	Robin Driscoll and Rowan Atkinson	12 March 1993
Bean is a contestant on Blind Date, hosted by Cilla Black, where he does his best to upstage his fellow suitors Rob (Paul Opacic) and Roddy (Alan Cumming) and cheat his way through the show in order to get a date with the beautiful Tracy (Barbara Durkin). He succeeds and in a sketch broadcast later in the telethon we see their date which plays out in true Bean style which, while enjoyable for him, proves less enjoyable for Tracy and fatal for some members of the hotel staff.
3	"Torvill & Bean"	Unknown	Robin Driscoll and Rowan Atkinson	17 March 1995
The title is a play on the names of Torvill and Dean famous British ice-skaters. Mr. Bean goes on a date with a woman to an ice skating show, where he wreaks his usual havoc when he attends a performance of "Show on Ice". He ends up posing as Christopher Dean when he accidentally knocks him out cold in his dressing room, leaving Mr. Bean to take his place alongside Torvill on the skating rink. After a disastrous performance, Christopher goes on stage and punches Mr. Bean, knocking him out. This sketch contains no laugh track, since it was not shown to a live audience. The female companion who Bean is dating is portrayed by Sophie Thompson whose overall appearance resembles Irma Gobb, originally played by Matilda Ziegler.
4	"Mr. Bean's Wedding"	Unknown	Unknown	16 March 2007
Bean causes chaos at a wedding he is attending. First, at the beginning of the ceremony, he rushes down the aisle where the bride and her father are walking and in the process knocks the latter down. Then, when the father attempts to take his seat, he finds that Bean is sitting in his spot and forces him to move along. As the priest starts the ceremony, Bean becomes bored, and also notices that all the men have flowers on their tuxedos. Wanting one, Bean attempts to pick a flower off of one of the decorations, but ends up disrupting the ceremony when the whole decoration falls onto the ground. Despite this, he successfully gets the flower and puts it on his shirt. When the priest gets to the part where there are any objections to the marriage, Bean sneezes loudly and steals the tissue off of the bride's mother to blow his nose. The ceremony continues with Bean shushing a man and woman coughing, and then the whole ceremony abruptly stops when Bean's gift wrapped alarm clock starts ringing continuously. Bean attempts to silence it by hiding it under his jacket, but when this doesn't work, he frantically opens the box, accidentally hitting the mother with his hand and the father with the lid in the process, and finally shuts it off. By this point, everyone is becoming annoyed by Bean and his behaviour, especially the father. The ceremony resumes with a choir boy singing, but Bean becomes so bored by this he falls asleep and starts snoring on the father's shoulder, but he suddenly wakes up when the song ends. When it is time for the bride and groom to exchange vows, Bean interrupts by repeating the first line that the groom was supposed to say. He then mocks the groom while he is repeating the rest of his vows. When it is the bride's turn to say her vows, Bean distracts the cameraman by acting ridiculously to the lens. The priest then finally declares the two husband and wife, and when the two, kiss Bean humorously covers his eyes. At the ceremony's conclusion, the priest starts a prayer, and when Bean discovers he doesn't have a kneeling mat to pray on, he steals one from the father, which causes him to hit his head on the floor hard. When the newly married couple walk down the aisle, the bride's father finally blows his top at Bean and attempts to attack him. As Bean backs away in fear, he accidentally steps on the back of the bride's wedding dress, causing it to rip and fall off. Now going into a blind rage, the groom attempts to assault Bean by punching him in the face, only for him to manage to evade every swing, as the groom ends up hitting the wedding sponsor, the priest, and finally his new wife. As the horrified groom checks on her, Bean makes a run for the exit, but quickly returns to give the alarm clock to the bride. He gives her a thumbs up before running out the church. The sketch also starred Alex Macqueen, Michelle Ryan, Matthew Macfadyen and David Haig.
5	"Mr. Bean: Funeral"	Olly Parker	Richard Curtis and Rowan Atkinson	13 March 2015
Mr. Bean returned in a sketch for Comic Relief to celebrate his 25th anniversary. In the sketch, Mr. Bean attends a funeral and does his best to fit in. When a man next to Bean blows his nose, Bean does the same thing, but blows loud. He also cries when people start to cry. When Bean sees a man bowing to the coffin, kissing the wife and shaking the husband's hand, Bean does the same thing, but he kisses the wife passionately and hugs the husband. A man pats the coffin, so Bean gently pats the coffin before patting the coffin again and pretends that the deceased is alive, before explaining that it was a joke. Before going to his seat, Bean takes a selfie next to the coffin. After seeing a girl putting a flower on the coffin and hugging it, Bean decides to do it. However, since he doesn't have a flower, he puts a bag of boiled sweets on the coffin, but when hugging it, he accidentally knocks it down, but manages to fix it a little (with some help), but rearranges the word "love" to "vole". When he sees the wife cry, he goes to kiss her before being pulled away by the man. When the priest says that the funeral is for a man named David, Bean realises that he is at the wrong one and quickly drives to the chapel next door. After arriving there, he realises that he left his boiled sweets at the other funeral and quickly crawls back to retrieve them while the choir was singing Immortal, Invisible, God Only Wise on the first stanza. This sketch guest starred Ben Miller and Rebecca Front.

=== YouTube sketches ===
No.	Title	Directed by	Written by	Original release date
1	"Mr. Bean's 25th Anniversary: Mr. Bean Drives His Car Again!"	Unknown	Unknown	5 September 2015
Bean celebrates his 25th anniversary. Bean and Teddy drive around in London in his Mini, which has a #MrBean25 hashtag sticker on the side. With his car full of presents, there is no room for Bean inside the car, so he drives the car from the roof. This recreates a memorable scene from the episode "Do-It-Yourself Mr. Bean". He drives through St James's Park, where he stops for a selfie with the London Eye and buys an ice cream. Then he careers down with a police escort, to a halt outside Buckingham Palace where a pile of small presents and a large crowd of sightseers await. He is given a huge cake in the shape of the number '25'. Bean gives some interviews and poses for pictures.
2	"Beans Gets Diamond Play Button"	Unknown	Unknown	28 October 2018
A video that appears only on YouTube. In October 2018, Mr. Bean received YouTube's Diamond Play Button handed by Colinfurze, for his YouTube channel surpassing 10 million subscribers on the video platform. Bean also appeared in a video where Colinfurze built an RC Armchair from the animated series to celebrate the award.

=== Music videos ===
No.	Title	Directed by	Written by	Original release date
1	Hale and Pace, "The Stonk"	TBD	TBD	1991
Mr. Bean is seen playing the drums in this music video to the official Comic Relief song for the 1991 telethon.
2	Mr. Bean and Smear Campaign featuring Bruce Dickinson, "Elected"	Paul Weiland	TBD	1992
This music video was made to accompany the single that was released in support of Comic Relief and aired during the run-up to the general election. In this music video, Mr. Bean is seen standing for Parliament as the single member of "The Bean Party". He makes fun of the ruthless campaigning used by some activists and forces his way into peoples' homes or buys their votes by offering them money or televisions. Bean sticks his poster on a coffin that is being taken to a waiting hearse and after being spotted by a press photographer gives a lollipop to a random child, then forcibly takes it back after the photographer departs. While Bean is addressing for his platforms, the wall behind him opens revealing the toilet room and he tells the man there to go away. Finally, Bean sneakily replaces the ballot box with another box full of votes for him only to which as a result the other five running candidates receive a vote of zero while Bean receives more than 24,000 votes.
3	Boyzone, "Picture of You"	TBD	TBD	1997
Mr. Bean was featured in the music video for the Boyzone song "Picture of You", which was the main theme for the film adaptation of the series. In the video, Boyzone arrives on a street and perform the song while dressed as look-alikes of Bean. When Bean arrives, he starts to cause havoc while the band performs.
4	Matt Willis, "Crash"	TBD	TBD	2007
Official music video of Matt Willis's version of the song "Crash" originally performed by The Primitives first broadcast on Popworld in 2007.

=== Commercials ===
No.	Title	Directed by	Written by	Original release date
1	REMA 1000	TBD	TBD	1994
Three commercials for Scandinavian supermarket chain in Norway. The first sees Mr. Bean walking around a REMA 1000 supermarket branch where he physically compares the products he has already bought from another store with those in the store. A second features Bean at the till but he doesn't have enough money. He collects coins from his Mini and the floor using a hand-held vacuum cleaner and presents the contents to the cashier but still doesn't have enough. He almost steals a lollipop but when spotted he pretends that he is giving it to the child in the queue behind him. Bean waits until the child is leaving before stealing it back but the child has already eaten it. The third and final one sees Bean using a homemade contraption to scan for cheaper prices to the supermarket while annoying the customers.
2	M&M's	TBD	TBD	1997
Mr. Bean arrives at a bowling alley only to be heckled by the M&M's 'spokescandies' Red and Yellow due to his poor bowling ability. Bean then decides to pick Red up and bowl him like a bowling ball, which results in a strike and a spare.
3	PolyGram Filmed Entertainment	TBD	TBD	1997
Shown in theaters before the first film adaptation of the series, Mr. Bean appeared in a short video from PolyGram Filmed Entertainment where the narrator showcases rules inside the theater where a hand of an off-screen person takes items not allowed in the theater such as cigarettes, alcoholic drinks, phones, appliances, etc. When Bean is last seen drinking an extra-large cup of soda and a huge tub of popcorn, the hand appears but Bean angrily slaps it as the video ends.
4	Fujifilm	TBD	TBD	1999
Mr. Bean appeared in different commercials. In one Bean tries to take a photo of Teddy, who subsequently keeps falling out of shot, in front of the Big Ben during new years eve. Another one sees Bean watching UEFA Euro 2000 when his budgerigar escapes when he celebrated a goal. Bean only succeeds in trapping it in its cage using a photo. Another one Bean is taking photos of a Christmas tree in a shop. He then use these photos to create a fake Christmas tree of photos at his house. Different adverts for the same product also appeared in Japan.
5	Nissan Tino	TBD	TBD	1999
Only ever aired in Japan. Bean drives around the streets of Japan showing off his new Nissan Tino, but manages to offend the hierarchy's security guards when he smirks at them while driving past. He later takes the car back to the showroom and asks for a refund, despite claiming it is a fantastic car.
6	Snickers	Daniel Kleinman	Unknown	4 October 2014
One in a series of Snickers adverts where the protagonist doesn't perform or behave at their best until they've eaten a Snickers and appears as a completely different person until they've done so. In this one, Bean appears as the pre-Snickers alterego of a martial arts expert almost foiling a raid.
7	Etisalat	David Kerr	Unknown	19 February 2019
Mr. Bean appeared in a commercial for the Emirati-based telecommunications company Etisalat to promote Etisalat’ eLife Unlimited. Mr. Bean flips through the channels as action leaps off the screen and onto his couch. Rowan Atkinson, who also narrated the commercial, takes on multiple characters: a Scottish warrior, a gentleman and a lady from the Victorian era, a football player, a jungle man, a man revving up a chainsaw, a racing car driver, and a masked sword-wielding Spanish vigilante.

=== Guest appearances ===
Rowan Atkinson has also appeared in character as Mr. Bean in many normally factual television broadcasts, sometimes as a publicity stunt to promote a new episode, VHS, DVD or film.

No.	Title	Directed by	Written by	Original release date
1	Going Live!	Amanda Gabbitas	Unknown	30 November 1991
Mr. Bean answers questions about himself on the Saturday morning magazine show Going Live! with Phillip Schofield.
2	Des O'Connor Tonight	Unknown	Unknown	14 October 1992
Mr. Bean visits the British programme "Des O'Connor Tonight" to promote the release of the book Mr. Bean's Diary.
3	The Big Breakfast	TBD	TBD	1993
Mr. Bean visits the British programme "The Big Breakfast" to promote the release of Mr. Bean episodes on VHS.
4	Talkshowet (Danish)	Unknown	Unknown	8 September 1993
Mr. Bean visits the Danish talk show "Talkshowet" to promote the release of Mr. Bean episodes on VHS. Since there is no recorder in the studio, he successfully builds one himself.
5	Soundmixshow (Dutch)	Unknown	Unknown	16 September 1993
Mr. Bean visits the Dutch programme "Soundmixshow" to promote the release of Mr. Bean episodes on VHS. Mr. Bean sneaks into the studio where he meets the presenter Henny Huisman and promotes his new VHS. He gives it to the presenter but ask money for it, and after some hesitation, instead gives it for free. Mr. Bean then requests to audition and performs Big Spender from Shirley Bassey without success. He then leaves the studio, but not before he takes back the VHS he gave for free.
6	Blix från klar himmel (Swedish)	Unknown	Unknown	1 October 1993
Mr. Bean visits the Swedish talk show "Blix Från Klar Himmel" to promote the release of Mr. Bean episodes on VHS. Since there is no recorder in the studio, he successfully builds one himself.
7	Rondo (Norwegian)	TBD	TBD	October 1993
Mr. Bean visits the Norwegian talk show "Rondo" to promote the release of Mr. Bean episodes on VHS. Since there is no recorder in the studio, he successfully builds one himself.
8	Live & Kicking	Unknown	Unknown	16 October 1993
Mr. Bean visits "Live & Kicking" to promote the release of Mr. Bean episodes on VHS. Since there is no recorder in the studio, he successfully builds one himself.
9	Schmidteinander (German)	Unknown	Unknown	29 October 1994
Mr. Bean visits the German comedy show Schmidteinander to promote the release of the new Mr. Bean VHS. Since there is no recorder in the studio, he successfully builds one himself.
10	This Morning	TBD	TBD	1995
Mr. Bean arrives at the Albert Dock car park in time for filming a special TV appearance but is unable to find a suitable space for his Mini. He then finds a car belonging to Richard and Judy and moves the car backwards, inadvertently hurling it into the dock. He then reverses his Mini into the car spot. He is then taken into the studio to be interviewed by the pair, where they realise what he has done. They then invite him into the This Morning kitchen, where he causes mayhem while trying to prepare his favourite meal.
11	Late Night with Conan O'Brien	Unknown	Unknown	28 February 1996
Mr. Bean visits the United States and the American late-night talk show Late Night with Conan O'Brien to promote the release of the new Mr. Bean VHS. Mr. Bean arrives in a convoy of 6 limousines, the first 5 carrying a single part of his suit. Mr. Bean himself arrives in the last limousine in his underwear and changes his clothes on the street. He arrives on the set with his Walkman on, not enthusiastic to talk. Finally taking the Walkman off, he talks about his visit to America and the difference between Great Britain and America. Host Conan O'Brien and Mr. Bean then have a competition to show the difference, with Mr. Bean obviously cheating. He mentions that 555,000 copies of the VHS were sold in Germany the previous year and added this to his score.
12	The National Lottery Draws	Unknown	Unknown	2 August 1997
Aired on BBC One's National Lottery Results Show. Bean arrives in the studio, and informs the viewers that he is heading to the United States to star in his film about his adventures. He then introduces his creation which is used to select the exact balls on his lottery ticket and is refused the winnings by host Bob Monkhouse.
13	The Tonight Show with Jay Leno	Unknown	Unknown	16 October 1997
Rowan Atkinson as himself appeared on The Tonight Show with Jay Leno to promote the movie Bean. A short clip of Mr. Bean is shown. Where Mr. Bean is seen arriving in a Mini and parking on the special parking place of Jay Leno. He puts fake legs under the car with some tools to give the impression he is fixing the car(a scene also filmed for the movie, but didn't make the final edit)
14	An interview on Japanese television	TBD	TBD	1999
Aired exclusively in Japan. Mr. Bean appears on Japanese television for an interview but instead of embracing the culture he manages to embarrass himself by sticking chopsticks up his nose and falsely translating the Japanese language. He is then kicked off set for his tomfoolery and is told to never return to Japan.
15	Blue Peter Safety film	TBD	TBD	2004
Bean enlists the help of the Blue Peter team in order to help him construct a fireworks safety film for a new evening class project he is undertaking. When he later arrives at the class, he disposes of the film and instead begins to plug a series of new DVDs featuring himself.
16	The Dame Edna Treatment	Unknown	Unknown	17 March 2007
Aired during the first episode of The Dame Edna Treatment. Mr. Bean arrives at a local spa, and poses as a doctor in an attempt to gain access to the sauna and relaxation room. First, Bean pulls the hose out forcibly from underneath the customer. Then he sets another hose and puts it underneath the customer. After that, he connects the hose into the vacuum tube and he turns on the vacuum cleaner. The smoke emerges from the vacuum and Bean tries to fix it up. As the nurse comes in, he accidentally squirts her in dirt. However, the receptionist works out what he is up to and manages to subdue him before he gets a chance to speak to Dame Edna.
17	Blue Peter – Mr. Bean's Holiday Promotion	Unknown	Unknown	21 March 2007
Aired during a 2007 episode of Blue Peter. Mr. Bean invites the Blue Peter team to look at his holiday snaps he had taken while he was filming on the set of Mr. Bean's Holiday. However, Bean's camera breaks down and instead shows a series of clips from the film.
18	2009 Goodwood Revival	TBD	TBD	2009
In 2009, Rowan Atkinson appeared as Mr. Bean in a live appearance of the character, driving a recreation of the driving from the roof car stunt at the 2009 Goodwood Revival each day of the event, September 18–20, as part of Goodwood's celebration of 50 years of the Mini.
19	2012 Summer Olympics Opening Ceremony	Unknown	Unknown	27 July 2012
Rowan Atkinson made a special appearance, in character, as Mr. Bean (though without his trademark outfit and with grey hair) at the 2012 Summer Olympics opening ceremony. He pretended to accompany the London Symphony Orchestra in performing the theme from Chariots of Fire while taking pictures with his phone and blowing his nose. In a filmed sequence shown during the performance, Bean daydreams of joining the runners in the movie's iconic scene along West Sands at St. Andrews. He is shown beating the other runners by riding in a car, and then tripping the front runner.
20	Tonight 80's Talk Show	Unknown	Unknown	14 September 2014
Rowan Atkinson went to Shanghai as Mr. Bean. He appeared on Tonight 80's Talk Show with Wang Zijian on Dragon TV. It was his first visit to China.
21	Top Funny Comedian: The Movie	Kai Keung Lai	TBD	2017
Bean appeared in the Chinese film Top Funny Comedian, based on the TV series of the same name. The movie involves a number of characters getting involved in a series of misadventures during a visit to Macau, at the same time as Mr. Bean. Mr. Bean also appeared at the premiere on 19 March 2017 and appeared in an episode of the show aired 9 April 2017.
22	British Airways Safety Video: Director's Cut (2017)	Unknown	Unknown	18 July 2017
This safety video from British Airways features celebrity personalities reading through the safety procedures and encouraging people to donate to Comic Relief by putting loose change in any currency into the Flying Start envelope. Mr. Bean (though without his trademark outfit and with grey hair) makes a cameo appearance at the end of the video, fumbling around his seat for loose change to make a donation to the airline's Flying Start initiative.

=== Handy Bean ===
20 videos (4 to 7 minutes each) under the series name "Handy Bean" were released on YouTube between 2018 and 2020. These videos show Mr. Bean's hands doing different activities. They use stock sound and video from earlier Mr. Bean footage, with a younger actor providing the hands of Mr. Bean.

No.	Title	Directed by	Written by	Original release date
1	Mr Bean: Sandwich Stack	Unknown	Unknown	1 February 2018
Originally it was to promote a new Mr. Bean video game, an app, where the user attempted to build the highest stack sandwich. The advertisement for the game, had Mr. Bean making (or rather attempting to make) various sandwiches. It was released online on 1 February 2018, but a few months later it was re-released as the new series called "Handy Bean" on 25 May 2018.
2	Pizza	Unknown	Unknown	31 May 2018
3	Holiday Packing	Unknown	Unknown	26 June 2018
4	Painting Prize	Unknown	Unknown	7 August 2018
5	Salad	Unknown	Unknown	3 September 2018
6	Happy Birthday Mr Bean	Unknown	Unknown	15 September 2018
7	Halloween Bean	Unknown	Unknown	19 October 2018
8	Festive Bean	Unknown	Unknown	11 December 2018
9	Party Bean	Unknown	Unknown	21 December 2018
10	Valentine's Bean	Unknown	Unknown	12 February 2019
11	Pancake Bean	Unknown	Unknown	5 March 2019
12	Easter Eggs	Unknown	Unknown	15 April 2019
13	Gardening Bean	Unknown	Unknown	17 May 2019
14	Bean Picnic	Unknown	Unknown	19 June 2019
15	Bean T-Shirts	Unknown	Unknown	25 July 2019
16	Bean Ice Cream	Unknown	Unknown	2 August 2019
17	New Start	Unknown	Unknown	14 September 2019
18	Magic Bean	Unknown	Unknown	26 November 2019
19	Jingle Bean	Unknown	Unknown	21 December 2019
20	Dinner Date	Unknown	Unknown	12 February 2020
