= David Stoll =

David Stoll may refer to:

- David Stoll (anthropologist) (born 1952), American cultural anthropologist
- David Stoll (composer) (born 1948), English composer and educator
