= Kena Upanishad =

One of the ancient Sanskrit scriptures of Hinduism

Kena
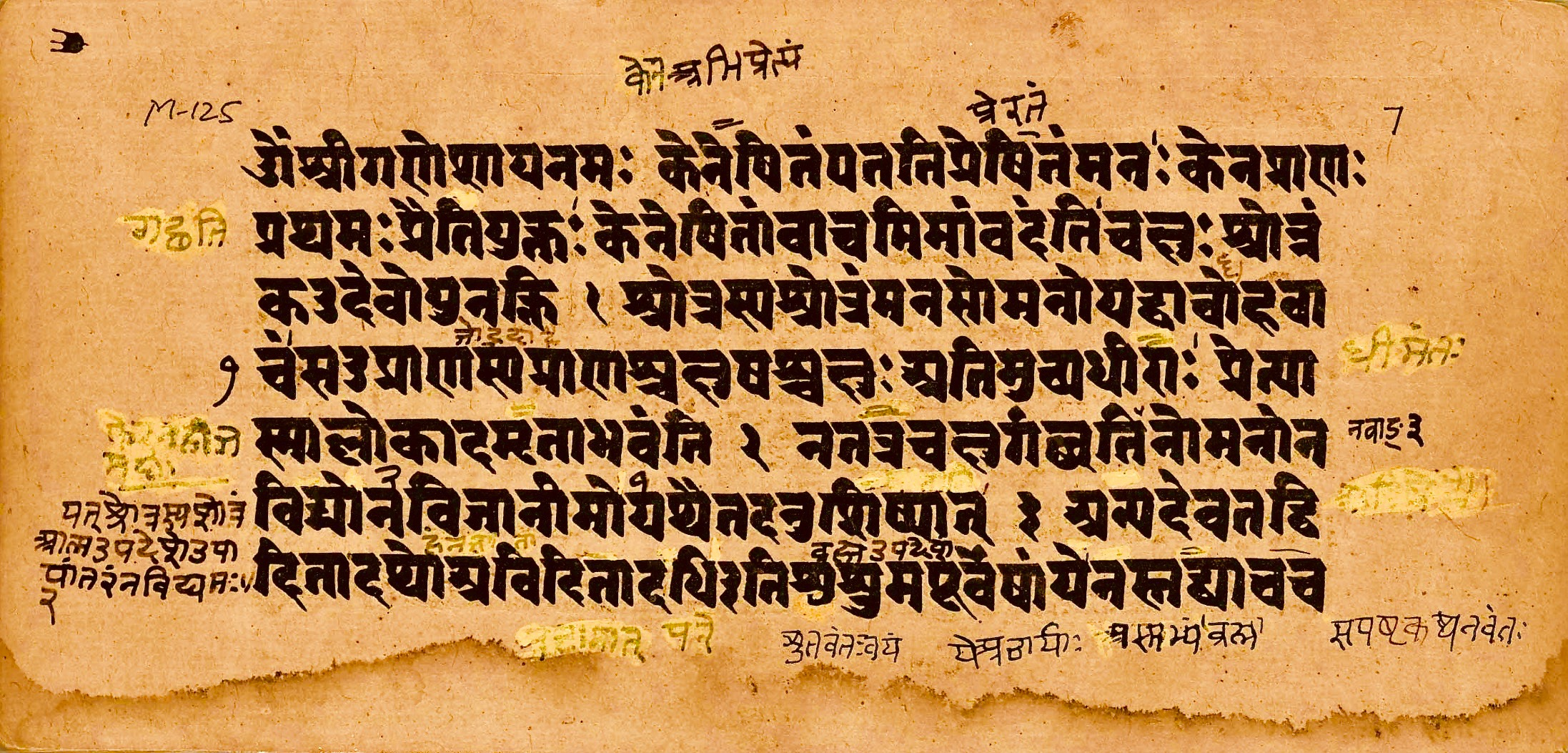
- Kena Upanishad Verses 1 to 4 (Sanskrit, Devanagari script)
- Devanagari: केन
- Date: 1 millennium BCE
- Type: Mukhya Upanishad
- Linked Veda: Samaveda
- Verses: 13
- Commented by: Adi Shankara, Madhavacharya, Ramanujacharya

The Kena Upanishad (Sanskrit: केनोपनिषद्, IAST: Kenopaniṣad) (also alternatively known as Talavakara Upanishad) is a Vedic Sanskrit text classified as one of the primary or Mukhya Upanishads that is embedded inside the last section of the Talavakara Brahmanam of the Samaveda. It is listed as number 2 in the Muktikā, the canon of the 108 Upanishads of Hinduism.

The Kena Upanishad was probably composed sometime around the middle of the 1st millennium BCE. It has an unusual structure where the first 13 are verses composed as a metric poem, followed by 15 prose paragraphs of main text plus 6 prose paragraphs of epilogue. Paul Deussen suggests that the latter prose section of the main text is far more ancient than the poetic first section, and Kena Upanishad bridged the more ancient prose Upanishad era with the metric poetic era of Upanishads that followed.

Kena Upanishad is notable in its discussion of Brahman with attributes and without attributes, and for being a treatise on "purely conceptual knowledge". It asserts that the efficient cause of all the gods, symbolically envisioned as forces of nature, is Brahman. This has made it a foundational scripture to Vedanta school of Hinduism, both the theistic and monistic sub-schools after varying interpretations. The Kena Upanishad is also significant in asserting the idea of "Spiritual Man", "Self is a wonderful being that even gods worship", "Atman (Self) exists", and "knowledge and spirituality are the goals and intense longing of all creatures".

== Etymology ==
Kena (Sanskrit: केन) literally means, depending on the object-subject context, "by what, by whom, whence, how, why, from what cause". This root of Kena, in the sense of "by whom" or "from what cause", is found the inquisitive first verse of the Kena Upanishad as follows,

केनेषितं पतति प्रेषितं मनः
केन प्राणः प्रथमः प्रैति युक्तः ।
केनेषितां वाचमिमां वदन्ति
चक्षुः श्रोत्रं क उ देवो युनक्ति ॥ १ ॥

— Kena Upanishad 1.1
Translation:

Sent by whom, flies out thither the mind?
Harnessed by whom, roves thither the first breath?
Who sends out the speech which we speak?
Who is the Deva (deity, god) that harnesses the ears and eyes?

— Translated by Paul Deussen

The Kena Upanishad belongs to the Talavakara Brahmana of Sama Veda, giving the etymological roots of an alternate name of Talavakara Upanishad for it, in ancient and medieval era Indian texts.

The Kena Upanishad is also referred to as the Kenopanishad (Sanskrit: केनोपनिषत्, Kenopaniṣat).

== Chronology ==
The chronology of Kena Upanishad, like other Vedic texts, is unclear and contested by scholars. All opinions rest on scanty evidence, an analysis of archaism, style and repetitions across texts, driven by assumptions about likely evolution of ideas, and on presumptions about which philosophy might have influenced which other Indian philosophies.

Stephen Phillips dates the Kena Upanishad as having been composed after the Brihadaranyaka, Chandogya, Isha, Taittiriya and Aitareya Upanishads (pre-6th century BCE), but before the Katha, Mundaka, Prasna, Mandukya, Svetasvatara and Maitri Upanishads, as well as before the earliest Buddhist Pali and Jaina canons.

R. D. Ranade posits a view similar to that of Phillips, with slightly different ordering, placing the Kena Upanishad's chronological composition in the third group of ancient Upanishads. Paul Deussen considers the Kena Upanishad to be bridging a period of prose composition and fusion of poetic creativity with ideas. M. Winternitz considers the Kena Upanishad as pre-Buddhist, pre-Jaina literature.

The text is likely from about the middle of 1st millennium BCE. Many of the ideas found in the Kena Upanishads have more ancient roots. For example, the ideas in verse 2 of the Kena Upanishad are found in the oldest Brihadaranyaka Upanishad's chapter 4.4, as well as the second oldest Chandogya Upanishad's chapter 8.12.

== Structure ==
Kena Upanishad has three parts: 13 verses in the first part, 15 paragraphs in the second part, and 6 paragraphs in the epilogue. These are distributed in four khaṇḍas (खण्ड, sections or volumes). The first Khanda has 8 verses, the second has 5 verses. The third Khanda has 12 paragraphs, while the fourth khanda has the remaining 9 (3 paragraphs of main text and 6 paragraphs of the epilogue).

The first two Khandas of the Kena Upanishad are poems, the last two are prose, with one exception. Paragraph 9 is prose and structurally out of place, which has led scholars to state that the paragraph 9 was inserted or is a corrupted version of the original manuscript in a more modern era. Another odd structural feature of the Kena Upanishad's poetic Khandas is verse 3, which has 8 lines (typically marked as 3a and 3b), while all other poetic verses in the first two sections are only 4 lines of mathematical metric construction.

There are some differences in the positioning of the Kena Upanishad in manuscripts discovered in different parts of India. It is, for example, the ninth chapter of Talavakara Brahmana in south Indian manuscripts and as mentioned in the Bhasya (commentary) by Shankara, while the Burnell manuscript of sections of Sama Veda places it in the tenth Anuvaka of the fourth chapter (inside Jaiminia Brahmana).

The Kena Upanishad is accepted as part of Sama Veda, but it is also found in manuscripts of Atharva collection. The difference between the two versions is minor and structural - in Sama Veda manuscripts, the Kena Upanishad has four sections, while the Atharva manuscripts show no such division into sections.

== Contents ==
=== Nature of knowledge - First khanda ===
The Kena Upanishad opens by questioning the nature of man, the origins, the essence and the relationship of him with knowledge and sensory perception. It then asserts that knowledge is of two types - empirical and conceptual. Empirical knowledge can be taught, described and discussed. Conceptual axiomatic knowledge cannot, states Kena Upanishad. Pure, abstract concepts are learnt and realized instead wherein it mentions that the highest reality is Brahman.

"There the eye goes not,
speech goes not, nor the mind.
We know not, we understand not,
how one would teach it?

Other is it indeed than the known,
and more over above the unknown.
Thus from the forbearers,
the doctrine has been transmitted to us.

— Kena Upanishad 1.3a and 1.3b, Translated by Woodburne

In verse 4, Kena Upanishad asserts that Brahman cannot be worshipped, because it has no attributes and is unthinkable, indescribable, eternal, all present reality. That what man worships is neither Atman-Brahman nor the path to Atman-Brahman. Rather, Brahman is that which cannot be perceived as empirical reality. It is that which "hears" the sound in ears, "sees" the view in eyes, "beholds" the words of speech, "smells" the aroma in breath, "comprehends" the meaning in thought. The Atman-Brahman is in man, not that which one worships outside.

Woodburne interprets the first khanda of Kena Upanishad to be describing Brahman in a manner that "faith" is described in Christianity. In contrast, Shankara interprets the first khanda entirely as monistic.

=== Self-awakening is the source of inner strength - Second khanda ===
The second khanda of Kena Upanishad starts with prose paragraph 9 that inserts a theistic theme, asserting that the worshipping of Brahman, described in the first khanda, is deception because that is phenomenal form of Brahman, one among gods. Verses 10 to 13, return to the poetic form, and the theme of what knowing Brahman is and what knowing Brahman is not. Verses 12 and 13 of Kena describe the state of self-realization (moksha), stating that those who are self-awakened gain inner strength, see the Spiritual Oneness in every being, and attain immortality. Charles Johnston refers to the state as the "Spiritual Man".

He, in whom it [Atman-Brahman] awakes, knows it
and finds immortality
That he is itself, gives him strength
That he knows it, gives immortality.

He, who found it here below, possesses the truth,
For him who has not found it here, it is great destruction,
In every being, the wise being perceives it,
and departing out of this world, becomes immortal.

— Kena Upanishad 2.12 - 2.13, Translated by Paul Deussen

=== Allegory of three gods and one goddess - Third and Fourth khandas ===
The third section of Kena is a fable, set in prose unlike the first two poetic sections. The fable is an allegory, states Paul Deussen. The allegory is, states the theosophist Charles Johnston, a "delicious piece of Sanskrit prose, fascinating in its simple style, and one of the deepest passages in all of Upanishads".

The fable begins by asserting that in a war between gods and demons, the Brahman won victory for the gods. The gods, however, praised themselves for the victory, saying, "Of us is this victory, of us is this might and glory". The Brahman noticed this. It revealed itself before the gods, who did not recognize and know it. The gods said, "what is this wonderful being?" They delegated god Agni (fire) to go discover who this wonderful being is.

Agni rushed to Brahman. The Brahman asked, "who are you?". Agni replied, "I am Agni, knower of beings". Brahman asked, "if so, what is the source of your power". Agni replied, "I am able to burn whatever is on earth." The Brahman then laid a piece of grass before Agni, and said, "Burn this, then." Agni rushed to the grass and tried his best to burn it. He failed. He turned back and returned to the gods. Agni told the gods, "I am unable to discover what this wonderful being is". The gods then nominated god Vayu (air) to go, and "explore, O Vayu, what this wonderful being is".

Vayu rushed to Brahman. The Brahman asked, "who are you?". Vayu replied, "I am Vayu, I am Matarisvan (what fills the aerial space around mother earth, mover in space)". Brahman asked, "if so, what is the source of your power". Vayu replied, "I am able to carry or pull whatever is on earth." The Brahman then laid a piece of grass before Vayu, and said, "Carry this, then." Vayu rushed to the grass and tried his best to lift and carry it away. He failed. He turned back and returned to the gods. Vayu told his fellow gods, "I am unable to discover what this wonderful being is". The gods then turned to god Indra (lightning, god of might) to go, and "explore, O mighty one, what this wonderful being is". "So be it", said Indra.

Indra went to Brahman. There, in the place of Brahman, he found a beautiful woman with knowledge. Her name was Umã. Indra asked Uma, "what is this wonderful being?"

Goddess Uma replied, "that is the Brahman; that is the one who obtained victory, though gods praise themselves for it". Indra then knew.

The tradition holds that Agni, Vayu and Indra are elevated above all other gods, respected first in ceremonies and rituals, because these three "met" and "experienced" the Brahman first. Indra is most celebrated because he "knew" Brahman first, among all gods.

– Translations by Deussen and by Johnston

Johnston states, as does the Hindu scholar Adi Shankara, that this simple story is loaded with symbolism. The Brahman, the three gods selected from numerous Vedic gods, and choice of the one goddess from many, the goddess Umã revealing spiritual knowledge about Brahman rather than the Brahman itself, as well the phrasing of the type "the wonderful being", are all allegorically referring to the spiritual themes of the Upanishads. Agni embodies fire, and symbolizes "natural self, with vital fire in all beings and everything". Vayu embodies space that envelops empirical existence, symbolizes "mental self, akin to thoughts about everything". Indra embodies lightning, light and illumination, thus symbolizing "causal conscious self, with light of truth that discerns correct knowledge from incorrect". The Brahman is Atman, the Eternal. The war between gods and demons is symbolism for the war between good and evil. Devas themselves are allegorical reference to sensory and intellectual capabilities of man, with the war symbolizing challenges a man faces in his journey through life. Kena Upanishad's allegory is suggesting that empirical actions, such as destruction by fire or moving a being from one place to another, does not lead to "knowing the essence of the subject, the wonderful being". The Upanishad is allegorically reminding that a victory of good over evil, is not of manifested self, but of the good, the eternal, the Atman-Brahman.

=== Epilogue - Fourth khanda ===
The epilogue in Kena Upanishad is contained in the last six paragraphs of the text. It asserts the timelessness and awareness of Brahman to be similar to moments of wondrous "Ah!!" in life, such as the focussed exclamation one makes upon witnessing lightning flash in the sky, or the focussed "Ah!!" recollection of a knowledge in one's mind of a memory from past. The goal of spiritual knowledge, of self awareness, is wonderful, characterized by an "intense longing" for it in all creatures, states Kena Upanishad. The knowledge of Atman-Brahman is Tadvanam (transcendental happiness, blissfulness).

In the final paragraphs, Kena Upanishad asserts ethical life as the foundation of self-knowledge and of Atman-Brahman.

तस्यै तपो दमः कर्मेति प्रतिष्ठा वेदाः सर्वाङ्गानि सत्यमायतनम् ॥ ८ ॥

Tapas, Damah, Work - these are the foundations, the Vedas are the limbs of the same, the Truth is its fulcrum.

— Kena Upanishad, 4.8 (paragraph 33)

== Reception ==
Adi Shankara wrote two commentaries on Kenopanishad. One is called Kenopaniṣad Padabhāṣya and the other is Kenopaniṣad Vākyabhāṣya. In his commentary on the third khanda of Kena Upanishad, Shankara equates Atman-Brahman with Ishvara-Parameshvara. This equality is repeated by Shankara in Brihadaranyaka Upanishad Bhasya in verses III.7.3 and IV.4.15, in the Bhasya on Chandogya Upanishad's verses I.1.1 and V.18.1, Katha Upanishad's Bhasya on hymn 11.2.13.

Anandagnana also wrote a commentary on Kena Upanishad. Till the late 19th century, the commentary of Shankara and Anandagnana were the only implied source of the existence of Kena Upanishad, as original manuscripts of Upanishad were believed to have been lost, after Dara Shikoh published a Persian translation of it. This changed in 1878, when Burnell found a manuscript and later published it. The French scholar Anquetil Duperron published a Latin translation from the Persian translated version with the title "Kin", while Windischmann and others published a German translation of the Kena Upanishad. Colebrooke, Poley, Weber, Roer and Gough are among the scholars who have discussed it.

George Haas includes a reading of Kena Upanishad, along with other primary Upanishads and the Bhagavad Gita, as essential to understanding the "wonderful old treasures of Hindu theosophic lore".

Edward Washburn Hopkins states that the aphoristic mention of "tapo dammah karma" in closing prose parts of Kena Upanishad suggests that ethical precepts of Yoga were well accepted in Indian spiritual traditions by the time Kena Upanishad was composed. Similarly, Shrimali cites Kena Upanishad, among other ancient Sanskrit texts, to state that knowledge-seeking and education system was formalized by 1st millennium BCE in India, highlighting among many examples, the question-answer structure of first khanda of Kena Upanishad.

Fred Dallmayr cites Kena Upanishad's opening lines to state that Upanishads' primary focus is Atman-Brahman (Self), in Hindu theosophy. These opening lines state,

सर्वं ब्रह्मौपनिषदं
Brahman is all of which the Upanishads speak.

— Kena Upanishad Opening Lines

== Evocation in non-religious arts ==
- Classical music

David Stoll composed "Sonata for 2 Pianos" in 1990 inspired by the opening verses of Kena Upanishad.

- Literature

Victor Hugo, French poet and novelist wrote in 1870 a poem entitled Suprématie (Supremacy), part of La Légende des siècles (The Legend of the Ages), Nouvelle série (New Series), a collection of poems, conceived as a depiction of the history of humanity (published in 1877).

This poem is inspired by the third khanda of the Kena Upanishad. The title Supremacy refers to Brahman. The text is written in verses, but Hugo took some liberties with the original, while maintaining the structure and narrative content of the text. He gives free rein to his imagination and use a rich and colourful vocabulary to add more details, in the spirit of the Romantic movement. Consequently, the poem is longer than the third khanda.

Thus, for example, he first brings in Vayu, then Agni and finally Indra, which, from the Hindu point of view, is erroneous, because he should have started with Agni; Brahman is referred to by the words "light", "appearance" and "clarity". He changed the ending (in form but not in substance): in the Upanishad, the Brahman avoids showing himself to Indra, so that he does not recognise him, but in the poem, the goddess Umā being absent from the story, cannot therefore tell the god that he is in dialogue with Brahman.

Hugo's ending differs significantly: Indra is said to triumph over the "Light" (Brahman), since he is able to "see" the strand of straw that Vayu and Agni could neither "make fly away" nor "burn". But this triumph is relative, even derisory, since he challenges the Brahman by saying "You cannot disappear from my sight". The last line shows that he has lost his challenge. Here are the last verses of the poem, translated into English (followed by the original French text):

Indra addresses the Light (=Brahman), who answers him:

― I know everything! I see everything! (Je sais tout ! je vois tout !)
― Do you see this strand of straw? (Vois-tu ce brin de paille ?)
Said the strange light from which came a voice. (Dit l'étrange clarté d'où sortait une voix.)
Indra lowered his head and shouted : (Indra baissa la tête et cria :)
― I see it. Light, I tell you that I embrace the whole being; (Je le vois. Lumière, je te dis que j'embrasse tout l'être;)
Thyself, do you hear, you cannot disappear (Toi-même, entends-tu bien, tu ne peux disparaître)
From my gaze, never eclipsed nor faded! (De mon regard, jamais éclipsé ni décru !)

No sooner had he spoken than it (the light) had disappeared (À peine eut-il parlé qu'elle (la lumière) avait disparu.).)

— Victor Hugo, 8 April 1870.

Ultimately, we can see that despite the differences that have been mentioned, one aspect of the Vedic text is perfectly expressed, i.e. : the absolute Supremacy of Brahman (hence the title) over all that exists, including the gods, even the greatest ones - reflecting the shared Indo-European heritage of cultures. However the crucial role of the Goddess in revealing the truth to the male gods has been suppressed, reflecting the more male-dominated historical orientation of European culture.
