= St Mary's Hospital, Portsmouth =

St Mary's Hospital
- Portsmouth Hospitals University NHS Trust
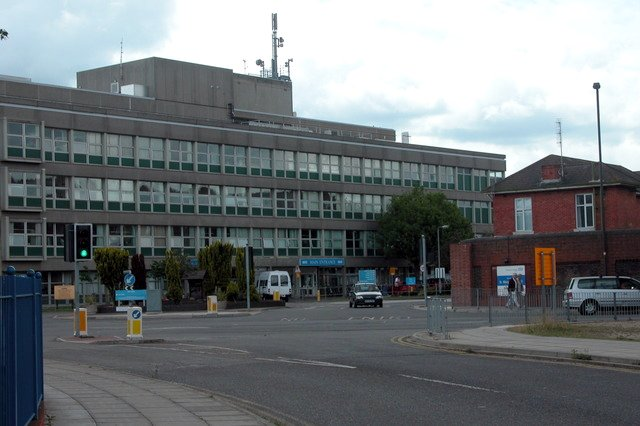
- St Mary's Hospital

- Shown in Hampshire

Geography
- Location: Milton Road, Portsmouth, Hampshire, England
- Coordinates: 50.8002°N 1.0635°W

Organisation
- Care system: NHS
- Type: Community

History
- Founded: 1846

Links
- Website: www.porthosp.nhs.uk
- Lists: Hospitals in England

St Mary's Hospital is a health facility in Milton Road, Portsmouth, Hampshire, England. It is managed by Portsmouth Hospitals University NHS Trust.

== History ==
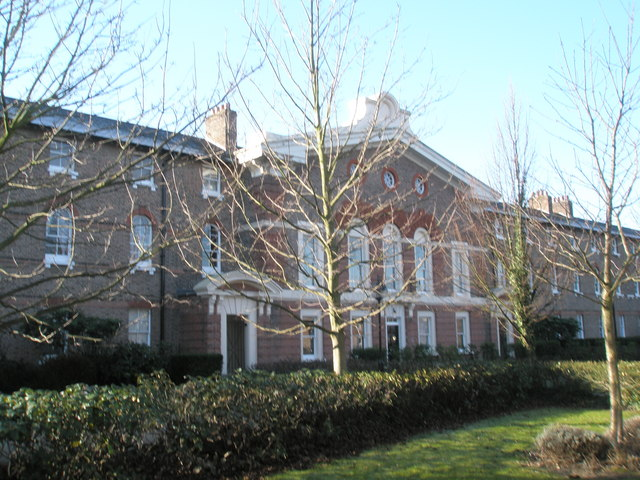
The main block of the old workhouse (now converted into flats)

The facility has its origins in the Portsea Island Union Workhouse which was designed by Augustus Livesay and Thomas Ellis Owen and which opened in 1846. A new infirmary block, designed by Charles Bevis, was added in 1896. The infirmary block was extended by the addition of a ward block and a maternity block in 1908. Further ward blocks were added in 1911.

The facility became St Mary's Hospital in 1930 and joined the National Health Service in 1948. The main block of the old workhouse was converted into flats and re-named "St Mary's House" in 1990.

In May 2018 the trust announced plans to refurbish the buildings and turn the site into a health campus.
