= Do-It-Yourself Mr. Bean =

- Mr. Bean episode
- Episode no.: Episode 9
- Directed by: John Birkin
- Written by: Robin Driscoll; Rowan Atkinson
- Original air date: 10 January 1994
- Running time: 25:28

Guest appearances
- Robert Austin; Helen Burns; David Stoll; Rupert Vansittart; Andy Greenhalgh

Episode chronology
← Previous "Mr. Bean in Room 426"	Next → "Mind the Baby, Mr. Bean"

"Do-It-Yourself Mr. Bean" is the ninth episode of the British television series Mr. Bean, produced by Tiger Aspect Productions and Thames Television for Central Independent Television. It was first broadcast on ITV on 10 January 1994 and was watched by 15.60 million viewers during its original transmission.

== Plot ==
=== Part One ===
Mr. Bean hosts a New Year's Eve celebration for his friends, Rupert and Hubert. When preparing refreshments, Bean improvises Twiglets from a tree branch dipped in Marmite and substitutes champagne with sweetened vinegar. Unhappy with the festivities, Rupert and Hubert trick Bean into by moving the clock forward to midnight, allowing them to leave; they discover a lively party happening next door and decide to join. Bean is in bed when the actual midnight strikes.

On New Year's Day, Bean drives to Arding & Hobbs to take advantage of the January sales, and reveals he had planted a dummy made up of balloons and a cauliflower outside the store the night before in order to be first in the queue. He buys numerous items, including an armchair in the window.

=== Part Two ===
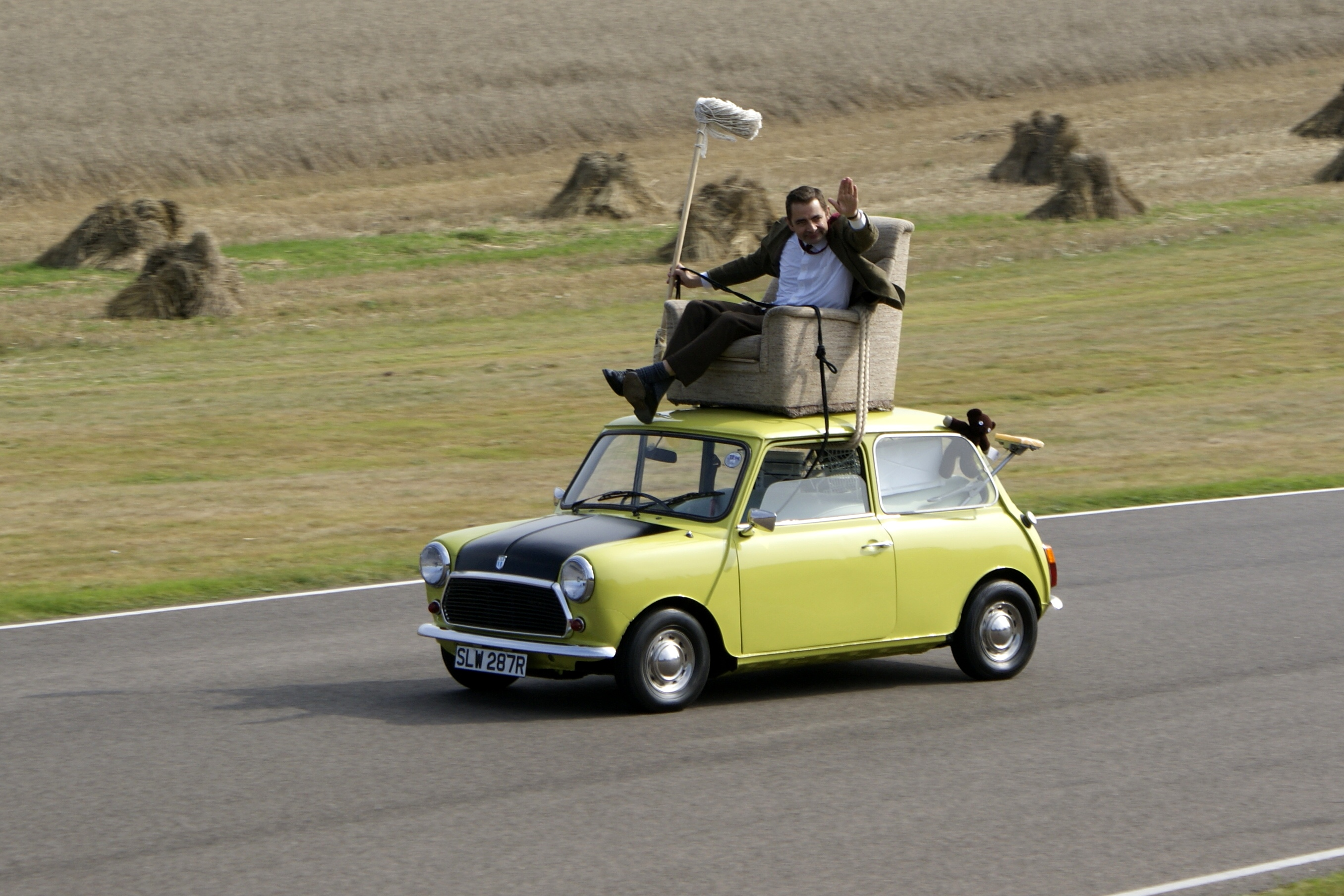
Rowan Atkinson recreating the driving scene from part two of the episode on a Mini at Goodwood Circuit

Unable to fit all of his purchases and himself into his Mini, Bean decides to drive it from the armchair atop the roof, using ropes to control the steering wheel and gear stick, and a broom to manage the pedals. Everything goes smoothly until Bean is diverted down a steep hill. He loses the broom's head trying to apply the brakes, and continues down the hill before eventually crashing into the rear of a lorry delivering mattresses and pillows.

Back at his flat, Bean begins to redecorate. He cuts out a chunk of wall with a reciprocating saw and uses it to fill the kitchen window, unknowingly cutting through a telephone cable and several pictures in the process. He then begins to paint the living room, using Teddy as a makeshift paintbrush. Eventually, Bean decides to cover every object in the flat with newspaper and then blow up the tin of paint with a firework. However, as Bean runs out and covers his ears, Hubert enters the flat to retrieve his hat. Bean returns to find the flat painted completely white, save for a patch of wall in the shape of Hubert reaching for his hat.

=== Extended scene ===
An extended scene, which is not seen in the original broadcast of the episode, was included in the American broadcasts on HBO as well as some home media versions.

Bean is shopping in the department store, when he sees a chair that he wishes to purchase. Upon approaching the reclining chair, he discovers that a sales assistant is already demonstrating its features to an elderly couple. When Bean realises that the couple wants to take the chair, he find ways of fooling them into thinking it is broken: he unplugs it, which is almost immediately noticed by the assistant. While the elderly woman is enjoyably sitting on the chair, Bean then sneaks up to a control panel on the chair's arm and tampers with the wires inside, unknown to the woman. As the woman tries out the reclining feature this time, it folds over, sandwiching her in the middle; she yells to her hearing-impaired husband for help but is unheard, despite being only a couple of metres away. In addition, Bean turns up the music playing on the store's intercom to make it harder for her to be heard. Ultimately, she falls backwards.

== Cast ==
- Rowan Atkinson as Mr. Bean
- Robert Austin as Hubert
- Simon Godley as Rupert
- Helen Burns as the woman on the narrow sofa
- David Stoll (uncredited)
- Rupert Vansittart as Police Officer
- Andy Greenhalgh (uncredited)

== Production ==
Location scenes were recorded on ENG videotape at Arding & Hobbs (run at the time as an Allders department store) in Battersea. Studio sequences were recorded at Teddington Studios, although for safety reasons, part of Act 3 was filmed without a live audience. It was also the first episode produced by Tiger Aspect founder Peter Bennett-Jones.

During its second transmission, the episode was watched by 12.96 million viewers, outrating the final two episodes of the series.

== Censorship ==
The scene of Bean cutting through a picture of Princess Diana was removed from reruns following her death in a car crash in Paris in 1997. However, some international airings left the scene intact.

== Legacy ==
MythBusters tested the idea of painting with explosives in Mind Control after being inspired by a rerun of the episode. They first ran tests to see if it was really possible to cover an entire room with paint by exploding a firework in a paint can, but the method was proven impossible by the test.

In a later revisit in Painting with Explosives/Bifurcated Boat, Jamie Hyneman's twist on Mr. Bean's technique using a steel sphere was also proven wrong while Adam Savage's snowflake frame twist on the idea worked, but not well enough to be either fake, confirmed or judged plausible.

The scene Act 2 where Bean uses a brick attached by some string to hold his car and releases the emergency brake was later reused in the episode "In the Pink" from Mr. Bean: The Animated Series where Bean uses the technique in order to arrest the thieves.

In 2009, Rowan Atkinson appeared as Mr. Bean during the Goodwood Revival driving a recreation of the car stunt as part of Goodwood's celebration of 50 years of the Mini.

In 2015, a recreation of the car stunt scene was staged in central London to promote the 25th anniversary of the series, ending with a photo call outside Buckingham Palace.
