= A. F. Livesay =

Augustus Frederick Livesay (8 May 1808 – 24 September 1879), known professionally as A. F. Livesay, was an architect based in Portsmouth and the Isle of Wight, England.

== Life and work ==
Livesay was born in Portsea, Portsmouth to John and Sarah Livesay. He trained in Caen, France, and was articled to James Adams (1785–1850) of Plymouth. He became a Fellow of the Royal Institute of British Architects in 1866.

Architectural historian Nikolaus Pevsner described Livesay as 'a sensitive architect', and considered his finest work to be St Mary's Church, Andover, which was rebuilt from 1840.

Livesay's son John Gillett Livesay (d. 1898) was also an architect, as was John's son George Augustus Bligh Livesay (1867–1916). Livesay was also the uncle of architect John Payne (1849–1921).

== Some buildings by A. F. Livesay ==
- Holy Spirit Church, Newtown, Isle of Wight, 1835
- Holy Trinity Church, Trowbridge, 1838
- St Mary's Church, Andover, 1840
- Portsea Island Union Workhouse (now St. Mary's Hospital), Portsmouth, with Thomas Ellis Owen, 1843-5
- Southsea House (later Queens Hotel (Southsea), 1861
