= The Ivors Academy =

British music writers' trade association (formerly BASCA)

- Industry: Music
- Founded: 1944; 82 years ago
- Headquarters: London, England
- Website: ivorsacademy.com

The Ivors Academy (the trading name of British Academy of Songwriters Composers and Authors – BASCA) is one of the largest professional associations for music writers in Europe. The academy works to protect and support and also campaigns the interests of songwriters, lyricists, and composers. It represents the music writers of all genres and has approximately 2,000 members.

== History ==
The Composers Guild of Great Britain was founded in 1944 to represent classical music composers, with Ralph Vaughan Williams elected as its first president. The Songwriters' Guild of Great Britain, later known as The British Academy of Songwriters, Composers and Authors was founded in 1947 by Ivor Novello, Sir Alan Herbert, Eric Coates, Haydn Wood, Richard Addinsell, among others, with Eric Maschwitz acting as the first Vice Chair, and Chairman in 1948, and again between 1954 and 1958. The Association of Professional Composers was founded in 1976 by George Fenton to represent composers of film and TV music. In 1958 the Composers' Guild of Great Britain began publishing the journal Composer, and also published a number of catalogues of available works. In 1967 the organisation, under the direction of Ruth Gipps, established the British Music Information Centre.

In 1999, the Association of Professional Composers (APC) and the Composers' Guild of Great Britain (CGGB) merged into the British Academy of Songwriters, Composers, and Authors to provide a single, more powerful amalgamated organisation to represent its membership. The organisation's current name, taken from its Ivor Novello Awards, was adopted in March 2009. Sir Tim Rice was elected first president, and Guy Fletcher and David Stoll served as joint chairs of a nine-member Board of Directors. Three executive committees were established to administer Pop and Theatrical Music, Concert Music, and Media. BASCA then had four genre committees representing Songwriters, Classical, Jazz, and Media composers. BASCA became known as the Ivors Academy on 25 March 2019. The organization then moved in 2021 to a structure with a "senate" consisting of 40 songwriters and composers with committees relating to multiple genres and geographic regions.

Members of the Ivors Academy include emerging songwriters and the United Kingdom's "most experienced and successful writers". The Ivors Academy is a member of UK Music, an umbrella organisation that represents the collective interests of the production side of the UK's commercial music industry: artists, musicians, songwriters, composers, record labels, artist managers, music publishers, studio producers, and music collecting societies.

In July 2016, songwriter Crispin Hunt became the chairman of the academy. Hunt was replaced by songwriter and composer Tom Gray as the chair of the Ivors Academy in February 2022. In the autumn of 2022, the Ivors Academy sponsored the 2021 Songwriters' Review in collaboration with music rights organisation Blokur. Singer-songwriter Olivia Rodrigo was announced as that year's leading songwriter.

In January 2026, a branch of the Academy was established in Ireland, in partnership with IMRO, with former Minister for Arts and Culture Catherine Martin as its Head of Policy.

== Awards ==
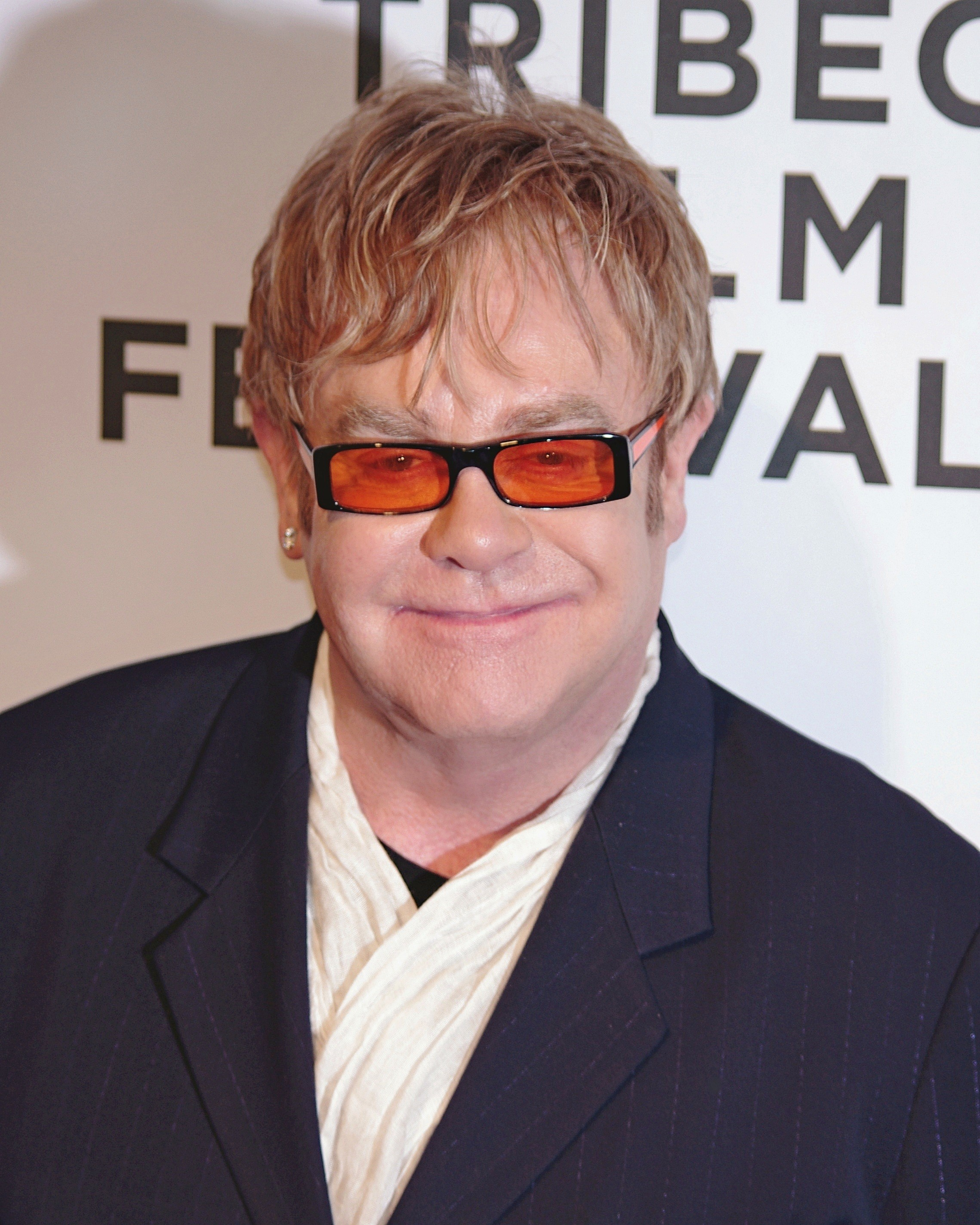
Elton John (2011)

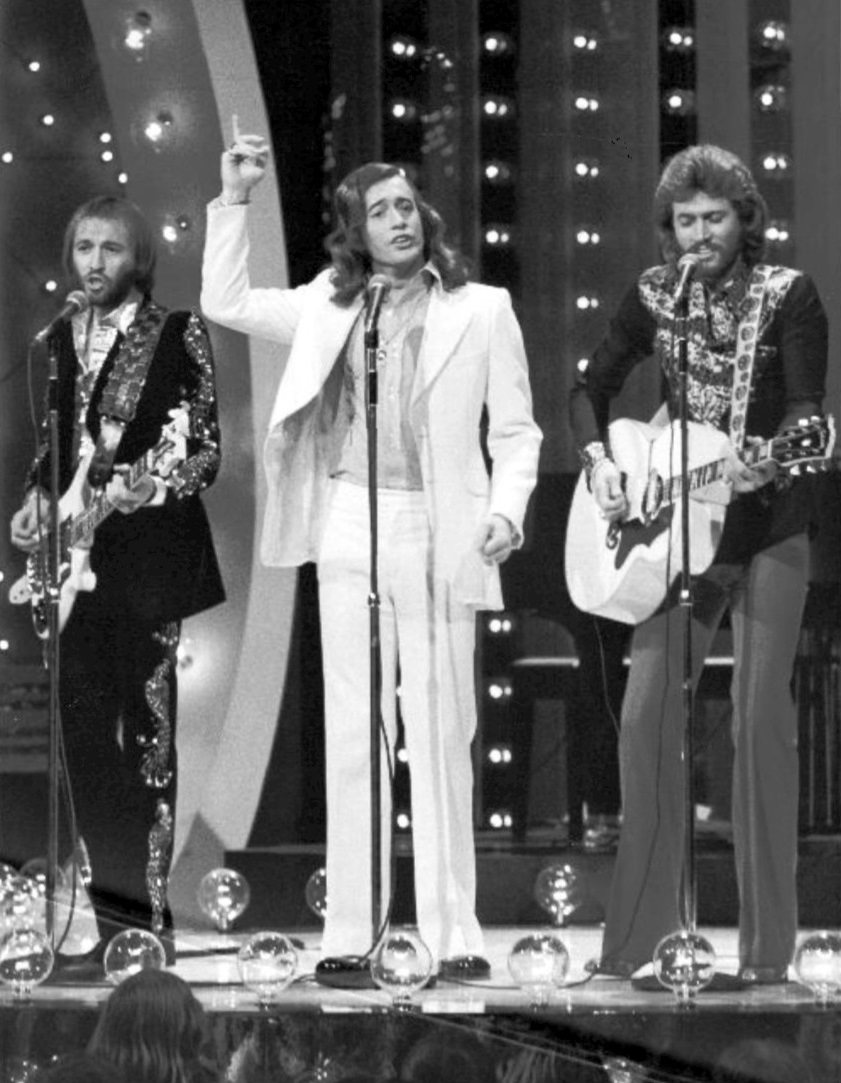
Bee Gees (1973)

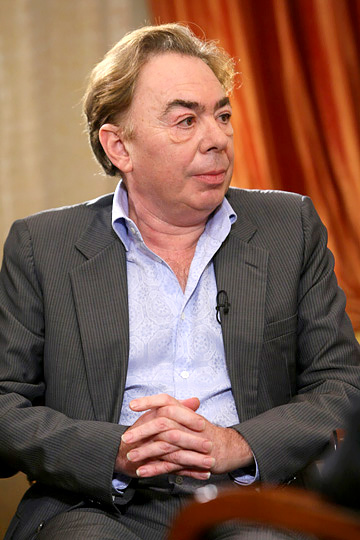
Andrew Lloyd Webber (2008)

In 1955, the Songwriters' Guild of Great Britain established the Ivor Novello Awards to honour excellence in British music writing. In 1974, the Academy established the Gold Badge Awards (now Ivors Academy Honours) for individuals who make outstanding contributions to Britain's music and entertainment industry, sponsored annually by PRS for Music. The organization also presents the British Composer Awards for excellence in classical and jazz music, also sponsored by the PRS for Music and in association with BBC Radio 3.

The Beatles have won 15 Ivor Novello Awards from the British Academy of Songwriters, Composers, and Authors. See also the List of awards and nominations received by the Beatles.

=== Fellowship ===
BASCA established the fellowship in 1999, and it was first awarded in 2000. Fellows are:

- 2000 – Paul McCartney
- 2001 – Malcolm Arnold, John Barry
- 2005 – John Adams, David Arnold, Pierre Boulez, John Dankworth, Peter Maxwell Davies, Elton John
- 2006 – Barry Gibb, Maurice Gibb, Robin Gibb (the three are all part of the Bee Gees)
- 2007 – George Fenton
- 2008 – David Ferguson
- 2009 – Don Black
- 2012 – Andrew Lloyd Webber
- 2013 – Tim Rice
- 2015 – Annie Lennox
- 2020 – Kate Bush
- 2022 – Peter Gabriel
- 2023 – Sting
- 2024 – James MacMillan, Bruce Springsteen (the first non-British performer inducted, Springsteen is from the United States)
- 2025 – Bono, the Edge, Adam Clayton, Larry Mullen Jr. (members of U2, the first Irish act to be so honoured)
- 2026 – George Michael, Thom Yorke
