= List of awards and nominations received by George Harrison =

George Harrison awards and nominations
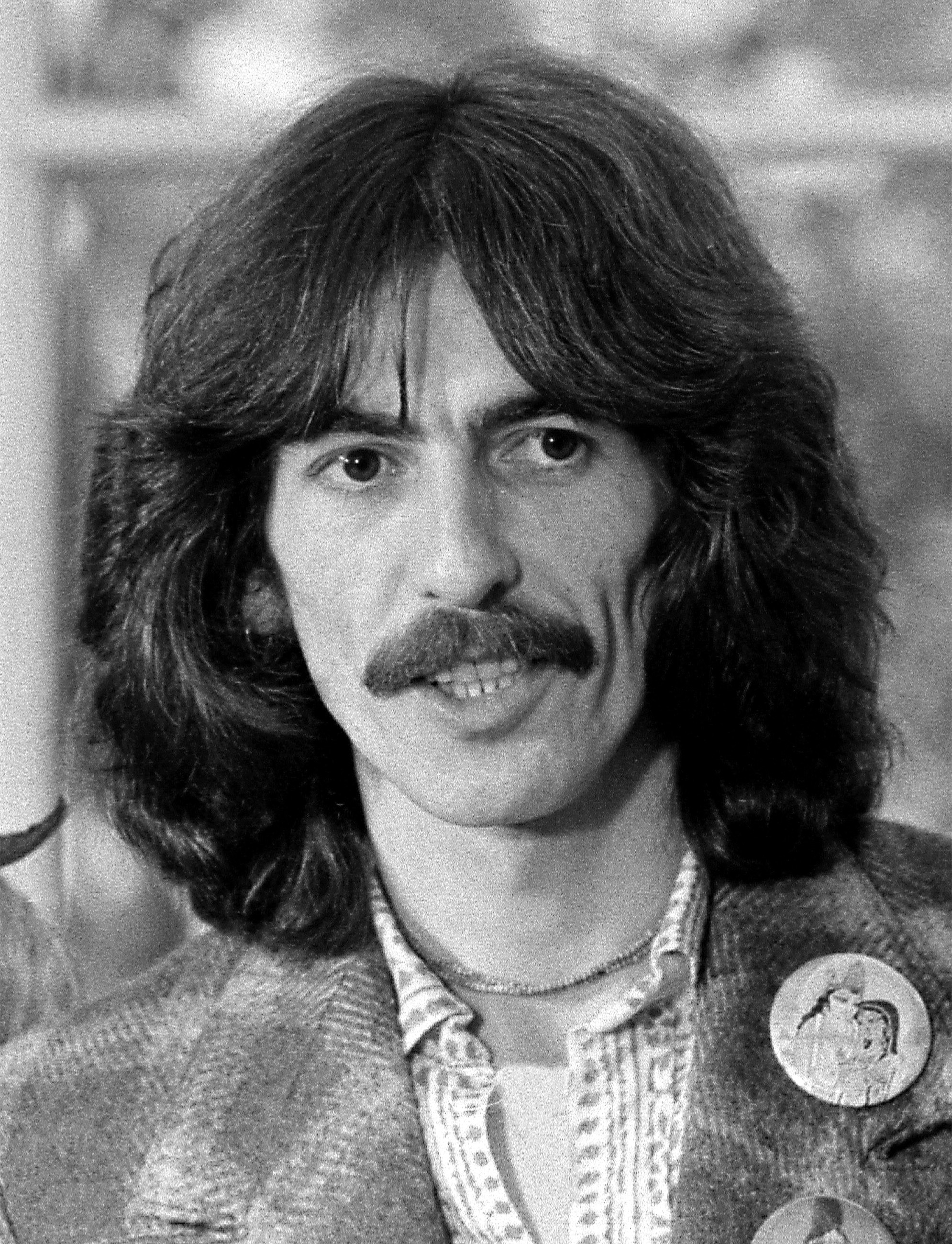
Awards and nominations
| Award | Wins | Nominations |
| Grammy | 4 | 6 |
| Billboard Music Awards | 1 | 1 |
| Hollywood Walk of Fame | 1 | 1 |
| MTV Music Video Awards | 0 | 8 |
| Academy Awards | 1 | 1 |

Totals (Note: Certain award groups do not simply award one winner. They acknowledge several different recipients, have runners-up, and have third place. Since this is a specific recognition and is different from losing an award, runner-up mentions are considered wins in this award tally. For simplification and to avoid errors, each award in this list has been presumed to have had a prior nomination.)
- Wins: 10
- Nominations: 9

This is a list of awards received by English artist George Harrison. Harrison has won awards both as a recording artist and for his work in film. Additional honors are posted at Legacy.

== Academy Awards ==
| Year | Nominee / work | Award | Result |
|---|---|---|---|
| 1971 | Let It Be (from Let It Be) | Best Original or Adaptation Score | Won |

== Billboard ==
| Year | Nominee / work | Award | Result |
|---|---|---|---|
| 1992 | George Harrison | Billboard Century Award | Won |

== British Independent Film Awards ==
| Year | Nominee / work | Award | Result |
|---|---|---|---|
| 2002 | George Harrison | Lifetime Achievement Award | Won |

== Evening Standard British Film Awards ==
| Year | Nominee / work | Award | Result |
|---|---|---|---|
| 1986 | George Harrison | Special Award | Won |

== Ivor Novello Awards ==
| Year | Nominee / work | Award | Result |
|---|---|---|---|
| 1969 | "Something" | Best Song Musically and Lyrically | Won |

== Hollywood Chamber of Commerce ==
| Year | Nominee / work | Award | Result |
|---|---|---|---|
| 2009 | George Harrison | Hollywood Walk of Fame Star | Won |

== Grammy Awards ==
| Year | Nominee / work | Award | Result |
|---|---|---|---|
| 1965 | The Beatles | Best New Artist | Won |
| 1965 | "I Want to Hold Your Hand" | Record of the Year | Nominated |
| 1965 | A Hard Day's Night | Best Performance by a Vocal Group | Won |
| 1965 | A Hard Day's Night | Best Rock & Roll Recording | Nominated |
| 1966 | Help! | Album of the Year | Nominated |
| 1966 | Help! | Best Performance by a Vocal Group Performance | Nominated |
| 1966 | Help! | Best Contemporary (R&R) Performance – Group (Vocal or Instrumental) | Nominated |
| 1966 | Help! | Best Original Score Written for a Motion Picture or Television Show | Nominated |
| 1967 | Revolver | Album of the Year | Nominated |
| 1968 | Sgt. Pepper's Lonely Hearts Club Band | Album of the Year | Won |
| 1968 | Sgt. Pepper's Lonely Hearts Club Band | Best Contemporary Album | Won |
| 1968 | Sgt. Pepper's Lonely Hearts Club Band | Best Performance by a Vocal Group | Nominated |
| 1968 | Sgt. Pepper's Lonely Hearts Club Band | Best Contemporary Group Performance (Vocal or Instrumental) | Nominated |
| 1968 | "A Day in the Life" | Best Instrumental Arrangement Accompanying Vocalist(s)/Best Background Arrangement | Nominated |
| 1969 | Magical Mystery Tour | Album of the Year | Nominated |
| 1969 | "Hey Jude" | Record of the Year | Nominated |
| 1969 | "Hey Jude" | Best Contemporary Pop Performance – Vocal, Duo or Group | Nominated |
| 1970 | Abbey Road | Album of the Year | Nominated |
| 1970 | Abbey Road | Best Contemporary Vocal Performance by a Group | Nominated |
| 1970 | Yellow Submarine | Best Original Score Written for a Motion Picture or a Television Special | Nominated |
| 1971 | "Let It Be" | Record of the Year | Nominated |
| 1971 | Let It Be | Best Contemporary Vocal Performance by a Duo, Group or Chorus | Nominated |
| 1971 | Let It Be | Best Original Score Written for a Motion Picture or a Television Special | Won |
| 1972 | All Things Must Pass | Album of the Year | Nominated |
| 1972 | "My Sweet Lord" | Record of the Year | Nominated |
| 1973 | The Concert for Bangladesh | Album of the Year | Won |
| 1989 | "When We Was Fab" | Best Concept Music Video | Nominated |
| 1990 | Traveling Wilburys Vol. 1 | Best Rock Performance by a Duo or Group with Vocal | Won |
| 1990 | Traveling Wilburys Vol. 1 | Album of the Year | Nominated |
| 1994 | "My Back Pages" | Best Rock Performance by a Duo or Group with Vocal | Nominated |
| 1996 | "Live at the BBC" | Best Historical Album | Nominated |
| 1997 | "Free as a Bird" | Best Pop Performance by a Duo or Group with Vocal | Won |
| 1997 | "Free as a Bird" | Best Music Video, Short Form | Won |
| 1997 | The Beatles Anthology | Best Music Video, Long Form | Won |
| 2004 | Brainwashed | Best Pop Vocal Album | Nominated |
| 2004 | "Marwa Blues" | Best Pop Instrumental Performance | Won |
| 2004 | "Any Road" | Best Male Pop Vocal Performance | Nominated |
| 2014 | All Things Must Pass | Grammy Hall of Fame | Won |
| 2015 | George Harrison | Lifetime Achievement Award | Won |
| 2022 | All Things Must Pass: 50th Anniversary | Best Boxed or Special Limited Edition Package | Won |

== MTV Music Video Awards ==
| Year | Nominee / work | Award | Result |
|---|---|---|---|
| 1988 | "When We Was Fab" | Video of the Year | Nominated |
| 1988 | "Got My Mind Set on You" | Best Male Video | Nominated |
| 1988 | "When We Was Fab" | Best Concept Video | Nominated |
| 1988 | "When We Was Fab" | Breakthrough Video | Nominated |
| 1988 | "When We Was Fab" | Best Special Effects in a Video | Nominated |
| 1988 | "Got My Mind Set on You" | Best Special Effects in a Video | Nominated |
| 1988 | "When We Was Fab" | Best Art Direction in A Video | Nominated |
| 1988 | "When We Was Fab" | Viewer's Choice | Nominated |

== NME awards ==
| Year | Award | Recipient | Result |
|---|---|---|---|
| 1963 | World Vocal Group | The Beatles | Won |
| 1963 | British Vocal Group | The Beatles | Won |
| 1963 | Best British Disc Of The Year – "She Loves You" | The Beatles | Won |
| 1964 | Outstanding Vocal Group | The Beatles | Won |
| 1964 | British Vocal Group | The Beatles | Won |
| 1965 | British Vocal Group | The Beatles | Won |
| 1965 | World Vocal Group | The Beatles | Won |
| 1966 | British Vocal Group | The Beatles | Won |
| 1966 | Best British Disc This Year – "Eleanor Rigby" | The Beatles | Won |
| 1968 | World Vocal Group | The Beatles | Won |
| 1968 | British Vocal Group | The Beatles | Won |
| 1968 | Best British Disc This Year – ‘Hey Jude’ | The Beatles | Won |
| 1970 | Top British Group | The Beatles | Won |
| 1970 | 1970's Best British LP – ’Let It Be’ | The Beatles | Won |
| 1971 | Top British Group | The Beatles | Won |
| 1971 | Best British LP – ‘Let It Be’ | The Beatles | Won |

== Raindance Film Festival ==
| Year | Nominee / work | Award | Result |
|---|---|---|---|
| 2002 | George Harrison | Lifetime Achievement Award | Won |

== Rock And Roll Hall of Fame ==
| Year | Nominee / work | Award | Result |
|---|---|---|---|
| 2004 | George Harrison | Performer | Won |

== Sources ==
- George Harrison
- George Harrison

== See also ==
- List of awards and nominations received by the Beatles
