= List of 1997 box office number-one films in Australia =

This is a list of films which placed number-one at the weekly box office in Australia during 1997. Amounts are in Australian dollars.

== Number-one films ==
†	This denotes the highest-grossing movie of the year.

#	Week End Date	Film	Box Office	Notes	Ref
1	1 January 1997	Romeo + Juliet	$3,262,048		
2	8 January 1997	Romeo + Juliet	$2,647,109		
3	15 January 1997	The Ghost and the Darkness	$2,116,644		
4	22 January 1997	Romeo + Juliet	$1,681,805	Romeo + Juliet returned to number one in its fourth week of release	
5	29 January 1997	The Long Kiss Goodnight	$2,356,613		
6	5 February 1997	Michael	$2,099,465		
7	12 February 1997	Metro	$1,795,646		
8	19 February 1997	Evita	$1,975,797		
9	26 February 1997	Evita	$1,298,575		
10	5 March 1997	Scream	$1,178,340	Scream reached number one in its third week of release	
11	12 March 1997	Jerry Maguire	$3,560,854		
12	19 March 1997	Jerry Maguire	$2,650,273		
13	26 March 1997	Star Wars (Special Edition)	$3,642,450		
14	2 April 1997	Star Wars (Special Edition)	$3,012,266		
15	9 April 1997	Star Wars (Special Edition)	$1,685,293		
16	16 April 1997	The Empire Strikes Back (Special Edition)	$1,745,405		
17	23 April 1997	The Saint	$1,940,788		
18	30 April 1997	The Saint	$1,675,859		
19	7 May 1997	Donnie Brasco	$1,428,836		
20	14 May 1997	Donnie Brasco	$952,616		
21	21 May 1997	The Fifth Element	$2,886,364		
22	28 May 1997	The Fifth Element	$2,011,077		
23	4 June 1997	The Lost World: Jurassic Park	$7,192,821	The Lost World: Jurassic Park had a record opening for United International Pictures and for a May release	
24	11 June 1997	The Lost World: Jurassic Park	$5,189,041		
25	18 June 1997	Liar Liar	$6,233,234		
26	25 June 1997	Liar Liar	$4,523,995		
27	2 July 1997	Batman & Robin	$5,728,708		
28	9 July 1997	Bean	$6,535,285	Bean had a record opening for an independent distributor	
29	16 July 1997	Bean	$5,094,825		
30	23 July 1997	Con Air	$3,173,667		
31	30 July 1997	Con Air	$2,240,744		
32	6 August 1997	Con Air	$1,677,073		
33	13 August 1997	Conspiracy Theory	$2,616,591		
34	20 August 1997	Conspiracy Theory	$1,585,158		
35	27 August 1997	Austin Powers: International Man of Mystery	$1,371,660		
36	3 September 1997	Face/Off	$3,203,562		
37	10 September 1997	Face/Off	$2,144,339		
38	17 September 1997	Men in Black †	$7,672,056	Men in Black had a record opening for Columbia TriStar	
39	24 September 1997	Men in Black †	$5,257,091		
40	1 October 1997	My Best Friend's Wedding	$4,287,829		
41	8 October 1997	My Best Friend's Wedding	$3,852,141		
42	15 October 1997	My Best Friend's Wedding	$2,417,869		
43	22 October 1997	The Full Monty	$2,686,134		
44	29 October 1997	The Full Monty	$2,565,075		
45	5 November 1997	The Full Monty	$2,459,501		
46	12 November 1997	The Full Monty	$2,142,442		
47	19 November 1997	The Full Monty	$1,872,478		
48	26 November 1997	Air Force One	$2,508,774		
49	3 December 1997	Air Force One	$1,722,772		
50	10 December 1997	The Peacemaker	$1,676,751		
51	17 December 1997	Spawn	$1,500,000		
52	24 December 1997	Titanic	$4,370,000		
53	31 December 1997	Titanic	$5,289,923		

== Highest-grossing films ==
Highest-grossing films of 1997
Rank	Title	Distributor	Gross A$ million
1.	Men in Black	Columbia TriStar	$22,698,418
2.	Liar Liar	UIP/Universal	$21,117,778
3.	The Lost World: Jurassic Park	UIP/Universal	$20,071,203
4.	Bean	PolyGram	$19,204,585
5.	The Full Monty	Fox	$19,107,446
6.	My Best Friend's Wedding	Columbia TriStar	$17,201,966
7.	Jerry Maguire	Columbia TriStar	$14,027,136
8.	Batman & Robin	Warner Bros.	$13,474,350
9.	Romeo + Juliet	Fox	$12,886,821
10.	Star Wars (Special Edition)	Fox	$11,334,819

== See also ==
- List of Australian films - Australian films by year
