= List of awards and nominations received by the Beatles =

The Beatles awards and nominations
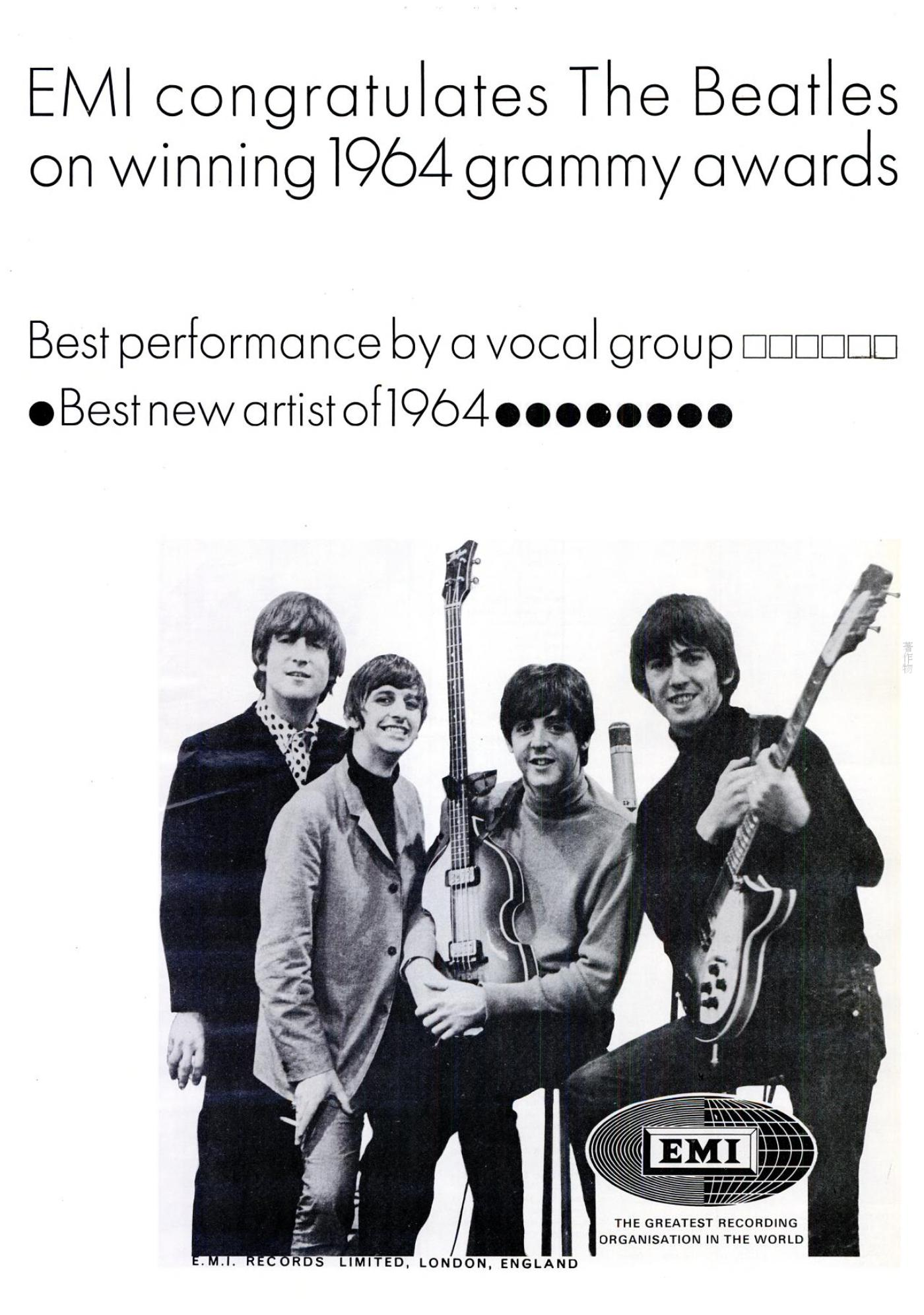
- Trade advertisement from EMI congratulating the Beatles for their 1964 Grammys
Awards and nominations
Award	Wins	Nominations
American Music Awards	1	1
Brit	4	4
Grammy	8	17
Ivor Novello	14	20
NME	17	17
World Music	3	3
Academy Awards	1	1

Totals (Note: Certain award groups do not simply award one winner. They acknowledge several different recipients, have runners-up, and have third place. Since this is a specific recognition and is different from losing an award, runner-up mentions are considered wins in this award tally. For simplification and to avoid errors, each award in this list has been presumed to have had a prior nomination.)
- Wins: 48
- Nominations: 63

The Beatles were an English rock band formed in Liverpool in 1960. With a lineup that consisted of John Lennon, Paul McCartney, George Harrison and Ringo Starr, the group has been regarded as the foremost and most influential music band in popular music history. The group received various awards and nominations during their career as a band, and has received more since their break-up.

== Academy Awards ==
The Academy Awards, commonly known as the "Oscars", are a set of awards given by the Academy of Motion Picture Arts and Sciences annually for excellence of cinematic achievements.

Year	Nominee / work	Award	Result	Ref.
1971	Let It Be	Best Music (Original Song Score)	Won	

== American Music Awards ==
The American Music Awards have been awarded annually since 1973 and determined by a poll of music buyers. The Beatles have received one nomination, plus one special award determined by an Internet poll.

Year	Nominee / work	Award	Result	Ref.
1997	Anthology 1	Favorite Pop/Rock Album	Nominated	

== Awit Awards ==
The Awit Awards are music awards in the Philippines given annually by the Philippine Association of the Record Industry (PARI) to recognize the outstanding achievements in the music industry. The Beatles won one award.

Year	Nominee / work	Award	Result
1969	The Beatles	Vocal Group of the Year - Foreign	Won

== Billboard Music Awards ==
The Billboard Music Awards honor artists for commercial performance in the U.S., based on record charts published by Billboard. The awards are based on sales data by Nielsen SoundScan and radio information by Nielsen Broadcast Data Systems. The award ceremony was held from 1990 to 2007, until its reintroduction in 2011.

Year	Nominee / work	Award	Result
2001	1	Album of the Year	Won
2001	The Beatles	Albums Artist of the Year	Nominated
2001	The Beatles	Duo/Group Albums Artist of the Year	Nominated

== Brit Awards ==
The Brit Awards, originally known as the BPI Awards, were created by the British Phonographic Industry. The Beatles have received four awards. (The initial awards covered the 25-year period from 1952 to 1977. Since 1982, the awards have been an annual event.)

Year	Nominee / work	Award	Result
1977	"She Loves You"	British Single of the Year	Nominated
1977	Sgt. Pepper's Lonely Hearts Club Band	British Album of the Year	Won
1977	The Beatles	British Group	Won
1977	The Beatles	Outstanding Contribution to Music	Won
1983	The Beatles	Outstanding Contribution to Music	Won

== Echo Music Prize ==
The Echo Music Prize, established in 1992, are held annually and are granted by the Deutsche Phono-Akademie. The Beatles have received two nominations.

Year	Nominee / work	Award	Result
2001	The Beatles	Best International Group	Nominated
2007	The Beatles	Best International Group	Nominated

== Fryderyk ==
The Fryderyk is an annual award ceremony in Poland, presented by the Związek Producentów Audio Video, the IFPI Poland, since 1994. The Beatles have received one nomination.

Year	Nominee / work	Award	Result	Ref.
2006	Love	Best Foreign Album	Nominated	

== Grammy Awards ==
The Grammy Awards are awarded annually by the National Academy of Recording Arts and Sciences in the United States. The Beatles have received 10 competitive awards out of 27 nominations (excluding special awards or awards for individuals). The Beatles were also credited as performers in the Grammy Award for Best Surround Sound Album for Love in 2008 won by the engineers and producers although the Beatles were ineligible for the awards. The Beatles (The Original Studio Recordings) won the 2011 Grammy Award for Best Historical Album which was presented to the box set's compilation producers and mastering engineers. In 2024, the animated music video for I'm Only Sleeping won the Grammy Award for Best Music Video although the award was given to its crew rather than the band.

Year	Nominee / work	Award	Result	Ref.
1965	"I Want to Hold Your Hand"	Record of the Year	Nominated	
1965	The Beatles	Best New Artist	Won	
1965	"A Hard Day's Night"	Best Rock & Roll Recording	Nominated	
1965	"A Hard Day's Night"	Best Performance by a Vocal Group	Won	
1966	Help!	Album of the Year	Nominated	
1966	"Help!"	Best Contemporary (R&R) Performance – Group (Vocal Or Instrumental)	Nominated	
1966	"Help!"	Best Performance by a Vocal Group	Nominated	
1967	"Michelle"	Song of the Year	Won	
1967	Revolver	Album of the Year	Nominated	
1968	Sgt. Pepper's Lonely Hearts Club Band	Album of the Year	Won	
1968	Sgt. Pepper's Lonely Hearts Club Band	Best Contemporary Album	Won	
1968	Sgt. Pepper's Lonely Hearts Club Band	Best Performance by a Vocal Group	Nominated	
1968	Sgt. Pepper's Lonely Hearts Club Band	Best Contemporary Group Performance (Vocal or Instrumental)	Nominated	
1968	"A Day in the Life"	Best Arrangement Accompanying Vocalist(s) or Instrumentalist(s)	Nominated	
1969	Magical Mystery Tour	Album of the Year	Nominated	
1969	"Hey Jude"	Record of the Year	Nominated	
1969	"Hey Jude"	Best Contemporary-Pop Performance, Vocal Duo or Group	Nominated	
1970	Abbey Road	Album of the Year	Nominated	
1970	Abbey Road	Best Contemporary Vocal Performance by a Group	Nominated	
1971	"Let It Be"	Record of the Year	Nominated	
1971	"Let It Be"	Best Contemporary Vocal Performance by a Duo, Group or Chorus	Nominated	
1971	"Let It Be"	Best Original Score Written for A Motion Picture or A Television Special	Won	
1997	The Beatles Anthology	Best Music Video, Long Form	Won	
1997	"Free as a Bird"	Best Music Video, Short Form	Won	
1997	"Free as a Bird"	Best Pop Performance by a Duo or Group with Vocal	Won	
2025	"Now and Then"	Record of the Year	Nominated	
2025	"Now and Then"	Best Rock Performance	Won	

=== Grammy Lifetime Achievement Award ===
The Grammy Lifetime Achievement Award is presented to those who, during their lifetimes, have made creative contributions of outstanding artistic significance to the field of recording. The Beatles won the award in 2014.

Year	Nominee / work	Award	Result
2014	The Beatles	Lifetime Achievement Award	Won

=== Grammy Trustees Award ===
The Grammy Trustees Award is presented to individuals who, during their careers in music, have made significant contributions, other than performance, to the field of recording. The Beatles won the award in 1972.

Year	Nominee / work	Award	Result
1972	The Beatles	Trustee Award	Won

=== Grammy Hall of Fame ===
The Grammy Hall of Fame was established by The Recording Academy's National Trustees in 1973 to honor recordings of lasting qualitative or historical significance that are at least 25 years old.

Year	Nominee / work	Award	Result
1993	Sgt. Pepper's Lonely Hearts Club Band	Inductee Album	Won
1995	Abbey Road	Inductee Album	Won
1997	"Yesterday"	Inductee Song	Won
1998	"I Want to Hold Your Hand"	Inductee Song	Won
1999	Revolver	Inductee Album	Won
1999	"Strawberry Fields Forever"	Inductee Song	Won
2000	The Beatles	Inductee Album	Won
2000	Rubber Soul	Inductee Album	Won
2000	A Hard Day's Night	Inductee Album	Won
2001	"Hey Jude"	Inductee Song	Won
2001	Meet the Beatles!	Inductee Album	Won
2002	"Eleanor Rigby"	Inductee Song	Won
2004	"Let It Be"	Inductee Song	Won
2008	"Help!"	Inductee Song	Won
2011	"Penny Lane"	Inductee Song	Won

== Ivor Novello Awards ==
The Ivor Novello Awards are presented annually in London by the British Academy of Songwriters, Composers and Authors (BASCA). The Beatles' songs were awarded fourteen times, while the group has received a Special Award.

Year	Nominee / work	Award	Result
1964	"She Loves You"	The Most Broadcast Work of the Year	Won
1964	"She Loves You"	The 'A' Side of the Record Issued in 1963 Which Achieved the Highest Certified British Sales	Won
1964	"All My Loving"	The Year's Outstanding Song	Nominated
1964	The Beatles	Special Award for Outstanding Services to British Music	Won
1965	"Can't Buy Me Love"	The Most Performed Work of the Year	Won
1965	"A Hard Day's Night"	The Most Performed Work of the Year	Nominated
1965	"Can't Buy Me Love"	The 'A' Side of the Record Issued in 1964 Which Achieved the Highest Certified British Sales	Won
1965	"I Feel Fine"	The 'A' Side of the Record Issued in 1964 Which Achieved the Highest Certified British Sales	Nominated
1965	"A Hard Day's Night"	The Year's Outstanding Theme from Radio, TV or Film	Nominated
1966	"We Can Work It Out"	The 'A' Side of the Record Issued in 1965 Which Achieved the Highest Certified British Sales	Won
1966	"Help!"	The 'A' Side of the Record Issued in 1965 Which Achieved the Highest Certified British Sales	Nominated
1966	"Yesterday"	Outstanding Song of 1965	Won
1967	"Michelle"	The Most Performed Work of the Year	Won
1967	"Yesterday"	The Most Performed Work of the Year	Nominated
1967	"Yellow Submarine"	The 'A' Side of the Record Issued in 1966 Which Achieved the Highest Certified British Sales	Won
1968	"She's Leaving Home"	Best British Song, Musically and Lyrically	Won
1969	"Hey Jude"	The 'A' Side of the Record Issued in 1968 Which Achieved the Highest Certified British Sales	Won
1970	"Get Back"	The 'A' Side of the Record Issued in 1969 Which Achieved the Highest Certified British Sales	Won
1970	"Ob-La-Di Ob-La-Da"	The Most Performed Work of the Year	Won
1971	"Something"	Best Song Musically and Lyrically	Won

== Japan Gold Disc Awards ==
The Recording Industry Association of Japan (RIAJ) presents the Japan Gold Disc Awards, honoring music sales in the country. The Beatles have received twelve awards.

Year	Nominee / work	Award	Result
1994	The Beatles	International Artist of the Year	Won
1994	1962–1966	Best International Rock Album	Won
1997	Anthology Vol.1 & 2	International Album of the Year	Won
2001	The Beatles	International Artist of the Year	Won
2001	1	Best 4 Albums	Won
2010	The Beatles	International Artist of the Year	Won
2016	The Beatles	International Artist of the Year	Won
2016	1	International Album of the Year	Won
2016	1	Best 3 Albums	Won
2016	1	Best Music Video	Won

== MOJO Awards ==
The MOJO Awards was a British award show given by music magazine Mojo.

Year	Nominee / work	Award	Result
2010	The Beatles Remastered	Catalogue Release Of The Year	Won

== Meteor Music Awards ==
Launched in 2001, the Meteor Music Awards are awarded for achievements in the Irish and international record industry. The Beatles has received one award.

Year	Nominee / work	Award	Result
2001	1	Best Selling International Group Album	Won

== MTV Video Music Awards ==
The MTV Video Music Awards (VMAs) is an award show by the cable network MTV to honor the top music videos of the year. It was first held at the end of the summer of 1984, and originally was an alternative to the Grammy Award in the video category. The Beatles have received one award out of two nominations.

Year	Nominee / work	Award	Result
1984	The Beatles	Video Vanguard Award	Won
1996	"Free as a Bird"	Best Special Effects in a Video	Nominated

== NME Awards ==
The NME Awards is an annual British award show given by music magazine NME. The Beatles have won seventeen times.

Year	Nominee / work	Award	Result
1963	The Beatles	World Vocal Group	Won
1963	The Beatles	British Vocal Group	Won
1963	"She Loves You"	Best British Disc Of The Year	Won
1964	The Beatles	Outstanding Vocal Group	Won
1964	The Beatles	British Vocal Group	Won
1965	The Beatles	World Vocal Group	Won
1965	The Beatles	British Vocal Group	Won
1966	"Eleanor Rigby"	Best British Disc This Year	Won
1966	The Beatles	British Vocal Group	Won
1968	The Beatles	World Vocal Group	Won
1968	The Beatles	British Vocal Group	Won
1968	"Hey Jude"	Best British Disc Of The Year	Won
1970	Let It Be	1970s Best British LP	Won
1970	The Beatles	Top British Group	Won
1971	Let It Be	1970s Best British LP	Won
1971	The Beatles	Top British Group	Won
2000	The Beatles	Best Band Ever	Won

== Q Awards ==
The Q Awards are a British annual awards held by music magazine Q, established in 1990. The Beatles have won one time.

Year	Nominee / work	Award	Result
1996	Anthology 1	Best Reissue/Compilation	Won

== Rock and Roll Hall of Fame ==
The Rock and Roll Hall of Fame, established in 1983 and located in Cleveland, Ohio, United States, is dedicated to recording the history of some of the best-known and most influential musicians, bands, producers, and others that have in some major way influenced the music industry, particularly in the area of rock and roll. The Beatles were inducted in 1988. Lennon, McCartney, Harrison and Starr have all been inducted individually.

Year	Nominee / work	Award	Result
1988	The Beatles	Honored Artist	Won

== UK Music Hall of Fame ==
The UK Music Hall of Fame was an awards ceremony to honour musicians for their lifetime contributions to music in the United Kingdom. The first ceremony inducted five founder members selected by committee of music experts, one for every decade since the 1950s. The Beatles were awarded for the 1960s.

Year	Nominee / work	Award	Result
2004	The Beatles	Founding member	Won

== Vocal Group Hall of Fame ==
The Vocal Group Hall Of Fame was founded in 1997 to honor the greatest vocal groups of all time who have achieved worldwide recognition by way of their recordings, television appearances and other entertainment media. The Beatles were inducted in 2004.

Year	Nominee / work	Award	Result
2004	The Beatles	Honored Artist	Won

== World Music Awards ==
The World Music Awards, established in 1989, are held annually and honour worldwide sales figures. The Beatles have received two competitive awards and the Diamond Award, given to recording artists who have sold over 100 million albums throughout their career.

Year	Nominee / work	Award	Result
2001	The Beatles	World's Best Selling Pop Rock Artists/Group	Won
2001	The Beatles	World's Best Selling British Artist	Won
2008	The Beatles	Chopard Diamond Award	Won

== See also ==
- The Beatles timeline
- List of awards and nominations received by Paul McCartney
- List of awards and nominations received by George Harrison
