= Bean (film) =

1997 comedy film

- Theatrical release poster
- Directed by: Mel Smith
- Written by: Richard Curtis; Robin Driscoll
- Based on: Mr. Bean by: Rowan Atkinson; Richard Curtis
- Produced by: Peter Bennett-Jones; Tim Bevan; Eric Fellner
- Starring: Rowan Atkinson; Peter MacNicol; Pamela Reed; Harris Yulin; Burt Reynolds
- Cinematography: Francis Kenny
- Edited by: Christopher Blunden
- Music by: Howard Goodall
- Production companies: PolyGram Filmed Entertainment; Working Title Films; Tiger Aspect Films
- Distributed by: PolyGram Filmed Entertainment Distribution, Inc.
- Release dates: 3 July 1997 (Australia); 1 August 1997 (United Kingdom); 7 November 1997 (United States)
- Running time: 89 minutes
- Country: United Kingdom
- Language: English
- Budget: $18 million
- Box office: $251.2 million

The painting Whistler's Mother

Bean (Note: Also known as Bean: The Ultimate Disaster Movie or Bean: The Movie) is a 1997 British comedy film directed by Mel Smith and written by Richard Curtis and Robin Driscoll, based on the British sitcom Mr. Bean. The film stars Rowan Atkinson as Mr. Bean, with Peter MacNicol, Pamela Reed, Harris Yulin and Burt Reynolds in supporting roles. In the film, Bean works as a security guard at the National Gallery in London before being sent to the United States to talk about the unveiling of James Abbott McNeill Whistler's 1871 painting Whistler's Mother.

Bean was released in the United Kingdom on 1 August 1997, by PolyGram Filmed Entertainment, and in the United States on 7 November by Gramercy Pictures. The film received mixed reviews from critics and was a box-office success, grossing $251 million against a budget of $18 million. A sequel, Mr. Bean's Holiday, was released in 2007.

== Plot ==
Mr. Bean is a well-meaning yet clumsy and destructive security guard at the National Gallery in London. After the gallery's sentimental chairman prevents the board of directors, who despise Bean for his laziness, from firing him, the board instead opts to send Bean on a three-month sabbatical to serve as their representative at an unveiling ceremony of the painting Whistler's Mother, which has been purchased by the Grierson Art Gallery in Los Angeles from the Musée d'Orsay.

The Grierson Gallery's curator, David Langley, impressed with the false identity of "Dr. Bean", offers to accommodate Bean in his home for two months against his family's wishes. After Bean gets arrested for causing a panic at the airport when he tricks the airport police into thinking he has a gun, and accidentally destroys the family's prized possessions, David's wife, Alison, leaves for her mother's house along with their children, Kevin and Jennifer. David begins to question Bean's status as an art expert following a visit to Pacific Park, where Bean is arrested again, this time for tampering with a simulator ride to make it more exciting for him, but injures several riders in the process. After Bean accidentally ruins a dinner with Mr. Grierson and his wife later that night, David discovers Bean does not hold a doctorate and knows nothing about art.

When Whistler's Mother is delivered to the gallery, Bean is left alone in the exhibition room, where he blows some of the dust off the painting, causing him to sneeze on it, and stains it with an ink-soaked handkerchief while wiping away his sneeze droplets. He then attempts to clean it with lacquer thinner, causing the figure's face to dissolve and prompting him to replace it with a cartoon face. Fearing the loss of his job and potential criminal charges over the damage, David becomes despondent and gets drunk with Bean, though his family returns out of pity. Later that night, determined to save David's career, Bean breaks into the gallery, where he incapacitates the security guard with laxatives and replaces the damaged Whistler's Mother with a life-sized poster coated in egg whites and nail varnish to resemble the real one, which successfully fools everyone at the ceremony the next day. Bean then gives an improvised and sentimental speech about the painting based on his time with David, winning the crowd's approval.

Lieutenant Brutus (the same officer who arrested Bean for the airport and Pacific Park incidents) arrives and informs David that Jennifer has just been severely injured in a motorcycle accident with her boyfriend, prompting David and Bean to rush to the hospital. Bean is mistaken for a medical doctor and forced into an operating room, where he encounters Brutus, who had been shot while dealing with a mugging on the way to the hospital and inadvertently saves his life by removing the bullet from his body with only his hand. David then begs Bean, unaware of his true identity, to wake Jennifer up from her unconscious state, which he succeeds in after an accident with a defibrillator sends him flying and landing on top of her. Grateful for having their daughter back and wondering how to repay their doctor, David and Alison are surprised when Bean unmasks himself. At Bean's suggestion, they allow him to stay with them for one more week.

After spending quality time together with the Langleys, Bean and David head back to the airport for Bean's flight home, where he thanks David for everything before he departs. At home, Bean decorates his bedroom with photographs of his time in Los Angeles, as well as the original Whistler's Mother painting he smuggled back with him.

== Cast ==
- Rowan Atkinson as Mr. Bean
- Peter MacNicol as David Langley
- John Mills as Chairman
- Pamela Reed as Alison Langley
- Harris Yulin as George Grierson
- Burt Reynolds as General Newton
- Richard Gant as Lieutenant Brutus
- Larry Drake as Elmer
- Sandra Oh as Bernice Schimmel
- Danny Goldring as Security Buck
- Johnny Galecki as Stingo Wheelie
- Chris Ellis as Detective Butler
- Andrew Lawrence as Kevin Langley
- Peter Egan as Lord Walton
- Peter Capaldi as Gareth
- June Brown as Delilah
- Peter James as Dr. Rosenblum
- Tricia Vessey as Jennifer Langley
- Tom McGowan as Walter Huntley
- Ronnie Yeskel as Mrs. Goodwoman
- Dakin Matthews as Man On Plane

== Production ==
In November 1991, a year after the original series premiered, Variety announced that 20th Century Fox was producing a film adaptation of Mr. Bean in association with the show's production company, Tiger Television, after the studio remade two sketches from the series into short films released theatrically, Mr. Bean Takes an Exam and Mr. Bean Goes to a Première. However, the film would later be instead produced by the UK-based Working Title Films and PolyGram Filmed Entertainment, under the latter's Gramercy Pictures banner.

=== Deleted and alternate scenes ===
The North American release of the film differs from the international release, as it includes an additional scene in which David suggests that Bean stuff the turkey while he distracts the Griersons during the dinner party. After losing his watch in the turkey, Bean gets his head stuck inside of it (a recycled gag from "Merry Christmas Mr. Bean") and stumbles blindly around the kitchen and the dining room.

The international release includes two alternate scenes on either side of the deleted turkey scene in order to explain its absence. While searching through the refrigerator, Bean first finds two frankfurters and then the onion that he offers as an appetizer. Upon finding the turkey, David asks Bean if he has cooked a turkey before, and he replies, "Oh yes." After the two shove the turkey into the microwave oven, Bean suggests running it for 20 minutes as opposed to the 5-hour cooking time suggested by David, causing the turkey to explode.

According to Atkinson in the documentary Bean Scenes Unseen, the differing scenes were the result of very different reactions from the North American and international audiences in test screenings.

== Music ==
Bean: The Album

Soundtrack album by various artists
- Released: 1 August 1997
- Label: Mercury Records
- Producer: Various artists

Singles from Bean: The Ultimate Disaster Movie Soundtrack
- 1. "Picture of You" Released: 21 July 1997

Professional ratings
Review scores
Source	Rating
Uncut	2/5 stars

The film score was composed and conducted by Howard Goodall, who also composed the original Mr. Bean series, although the original Mr. Bean theme was unused. Cover versions on the soundtrack album include the Beatles' "Yesterday" (sung by Wet Wet Wet), the OMC cover of "I Love L.A." (though the film itself uses Randy Newman's original version) and Alice Cooper's "Elected", performed by Iron Maiden lead singer Bruce Dickinson. "Elected" features sound dubs of Mr. Bean making campaign promises and was previously used in Comic Relief in 1992.

Boyzone released a single from the film, titled "Picture of You".

No.	Title	Artist(s)	Length
1.	"Picture of You"	Boyzone	3:27
2.	"I Get Around"	The Beach Boys	2:17
3.	"Walking on Sunshine"	Katrina and the Waves	3:51
4.	"Yesterday"	Wet Wet Wet	2:55
5.	"Running Back for More"	Louise	3:44
6.	"That Kinda Guy"	Thomas Jules-Stock	3:37
7.	"Give Me a Little More Time"	Gabrielle	4:02
8.	"I Love L.A." (Version not in the film)	OMC	4:07
9.	"He's a Rebel"	Alisha's Attic	2:26
10.	"Stuck in the Middle with You"	Susanna Hoffs	4:04
11.	"Art for Art's Sake"	10cc	4:19
12.	"Have Fun Go Mad"	Blair	3:39
13.	"Can We Talk (Pure Radio Mix)" (Not on some copies of the soundtrack)	Code Red	4:03
14.	"Bean Theme (Mad Pianos)"	Howard Goodall	3:01
15.	"Elected" (Not in the film)	Mr. Bean and Smear Campaign feat. Bruce Dickinson	4:32

== Reception ==
=== Box office ===
Bean opened in Australia on 3 July 1997 and grossed $3.1 million in its opening weekend from 193 screens with a $16,062 per-theater average, ranking number one for the weekend. It remained number one for a second week. In the United Kingdom, it opened on 8 August 1997 on 345 screens and grossed £2,563,326 ($4.0 million) (including previews of £284,936) with a £7,430 ($11,719) per-theater average, finishing second for the weekend behind the second weekend of Men in Black. It was the highest opening gross for a British production surpassing the £1.4 million opening of Four Weddings and a Funeral. In Germany, it grossed 12.3 million Deutsche Mark ($6.8 million) from 682 screens with a $9,998 per-theater average to take the number one spot, beating fellow opener The Fifth Element. It remained number one for a second week in Germany. It became the fastest UK film to gross $100 million and reached that milestone before opening in the US.

Bean opened in Canada on 17 October 1997 in 242 theaters and grossed $2,255,233 with a $9,319 per-theater average and ranking number ten at the US and Canadian box office, the first Canadian only release to reach the US and Canadian top 10. Upon its release in the United States on 7 November 1997, the film grossed $12,733,827 in its opening weekend while playing in 1,948 theaters, with a $6,536 per-theater average and ranking second behind Starship Troopers. Due to the R rating of Starship Troopers, its underperformance and Bean exceeding expectations, there were claims that viewers under 17 years old may have bought tickets for Bean and snuck in to see Starship Troopers.

By the end of its theatrical run, the film had grossed £17,902,161 in the UK, the fourth highest-grossing film for the year. It grossed $45,319,423 in the United States and Canada, and $251,212,670 worldwide.

=== Critical response ===
On the review aggregator website Rotten Tomatoes, 41% of 34 critics' reviews are positive, with an average rating of 5.4/10. The website's consensus reads: "Bean boasts a terrifically talented physical comedian in the title role, but his constant mugging and silly slapstick quickly wear thin." Metacritic, which uses a weighted average, assigned the film a score of 52 out of 100, based on 20 critics, indicating "mixed or average" reviews.

Roger Ebert of the Chicago Sun-Times gave the film two-and-a-half stars out of four, saying while he praised Bean for having "many moments that were very funny", he criticised the film's running time of 90 minutes, which he felt was too long: "At an hour, Bean would have been nonstop laughs. [But] then they added 30 minutes of stops."

== Sequel ==
A sequel, titled Mr. Bean's Holiday, was released in 2007, ten years after its predecessor's release.

== See also ==
- Musée d'Orsay, Paris, the actual location of the 1871 artwork Whistler's Mother
