= Mr. Bean in Room 426 =

- Mr. Bean episode
- Episode no.: Episode 8
- Directed by: Paul Weiland
- Written by: Robin Driscoll; Rowan Atkinson
- Original air date: 17 February 1993
- Running time: 24:58

Guest appearances
- Danny La Rue; Roger Brierley; Matthew Ashforde; Michael Fenton Stevens

Episode chronology
← Previous "Merry Christmas, Mr. Bean"	Next → "Do-It-Yourself Mr. Bean"

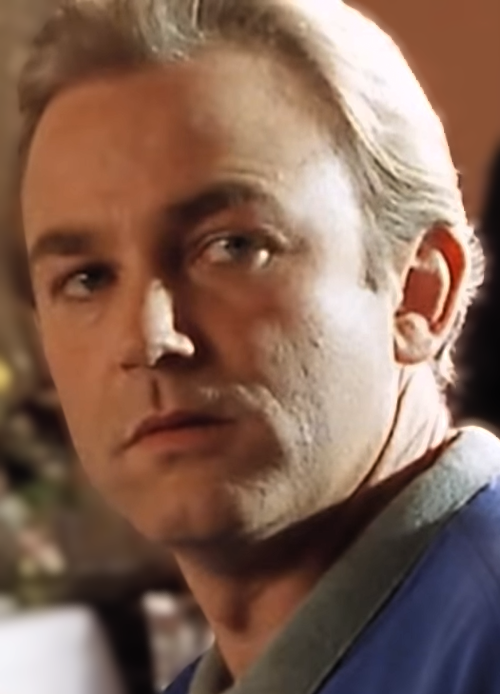
Michael Fenton Stevens as Bean's neighbor in room 425

"Mr. Bean in Room 426" (Note: also called "Mr. Bean was in Room 426" in the end credits) is the eighth episode of the British television series Mr. Bean, produced by Tiger Television and Thames Television for Central Independent Television. It was first broadcast on ITV on 17 February 1993 and was watched by 14.31 million viewers during its original transmission. This was the first episode to consist of a single storyline and was shot entirely on location in Southsea.

== Plot ==
=== Part One ===
Mr. Bean visits the Queens Hotel on a bank holiday. He checks in at the same time as a quiet man and they end up in adjoining rooms. Bean tries to beat the man to his room, but struggles to unlock his door and fails.

Once inside, Bean tries experimenting with the features of his room, such as the lights, telephone, and TV remote. Upon realising that there is no bathroom, he drills a hole in the wall to access his neighbour's. The noise and vibration of the drill is heard by the manager, who knocks on Bean's door to investigate, only to find that the man in the next room cannot open the door. Unbeknownst to them, Bean has locked the door and is taking a bath. He covers the hole with the shower curtain and his wardrobe afterwards.

=== Part Two ===
While heading to dinner, Bean is delayed by an elderly couple. Once downstairs, he takes double the amount of food his neighbour is taking from the buffet, then sits next to his neighbour and eats all of his food in an exaggerated fashion. When they reach the oysters, Bean quickly finishes his own, but the neighbour notices an unpleasant smell from the oysters and alerts the waiter, who confirms that they are spoiled. Bean witnesses this exchange and is horrified.

That night, Bean wakes up feeling hot and takes off his pyjamas. Loud music starts playing from the adjacent room, and Bean goes outside to shush. When the music stops, Bean proceeds back to his room, but the door swings shut, locking him outside of his room naked. Bean covers himself with door signs and makes his way to the ground floor, where Danny La Rue is giving a performance; he hides in La Rue's suitcase and changes into La Rue's spare dress and wig before the porter takes the suitcase to the car. In his disguise, Bean requests the key to his room, but as the manager looks for it, La Rue confronts Bean for stealing his belongings and rips an earring off of Bean's ear.

== Cast ==
- Rowan Atkinson as Mr. Bean
- Michael Fenton Stevens as the man in Room 425
- Roger Brierley as the hotel manager
- Matthew Ashforde as the hotel porter
- Danny La Rue as himself

== Production ==
This was the first episode to incorporate only one storyline instead of separate acts or sketches as well as the first to be shot entirely on location. The episode was filmed at the Queen's Hotel in the seaside resort of Southsea, Portsmouth, Hampshire. Principal photography began on 1 October 1992.

It was also the first full episode to be directed by Paul Weiland, previously the series' specialist director for film sequences. Another episode-length story, "Mind the Baby, Mr. Bean", was also filmed in Southsea.

This was also the first episode to be commissioned and presented for the ITV network by Central Independent Television following the loss of Thames' ITV franchise in London. Central would also oversee commissioning and compliance for a number of other Thames independent productions, such as Minder, Wish You Were Here...? and Strike It Lucky, until the ITV Network Centre removed the requirement for a "commissioning company" in the late 1990s.
