= Mind the Baby, Mr. Bean =

- Mr. Bean episode
- Episode no.: Episode 10
- Directed by: Paul Weiland
- Written by: Robin Driscoll; Rowan Atkinson
- Original air date: 25 April 1994
- Running time: 24:54

Guest appearances
- Susie McKenna; Nick Scott; Andy Bradford; Lydia Henderson-Boyle; Anthony Hambling

Episode chronology
← Previous "Do-It-Yourself Mr. Bean"	Next → "Back to School Mr. Bean"

"Mind the Baby, Mr. Bean" is the tenth episode of the British television series Mr. Bean, produced by Tiger Television and Thames Television for Central Independent Television. It was originally scheduled for broadcast on 17 February 1993 on ITV, but following the murder of Kirkby toddler James Bulger on 12 February 1993, it was delayed for over a year until 25 April 1994. It did, however, air in Australia on 21 May 1993 on ABC.

== Plot ==
=== Part One ===
Mr. Bean decides to go to the funfair at Southsea. He has difficulty finding it, especially after some people at the beach give him contradictory directions, but is eventually successful in locating the fair. However, the boot of his Mini is left open and not locked properly and, as he reverses and moves forward again, a baby's pram gets caught in the handle, and is towed along to the fair. Once Bean notices the "kidnapped" baby, he initially attempts to leave it in a crowd of chatting mothers with babies, but they are oblivious to the baby's presence and leave it behind. Bean reluctantly goes back for the baby. He sees who he believes to be a policeman outside the amusement park entrance and races to find him, but loses him among a crowd of boys wearing fake police helmets from a nearby souvenir shop. Bean eventually realises that he has got no choice but to look after the baby whilst enjoying himself. Bean unchains a Dobermann dog and uses the chain to tie the baby's pram on a moving ride while taking the baby with him on various rides. First, he goes to the dodgems, but in a rush to pay the man in charge, he puts the baby's feet on the pedal and has trouble getting back to the dodgem by riding on the back of other dodgems and driving his own while standing up. The man in charge stops the dodgems, crosses his arms and glares at Bean, who manages to hide the baby and sneak off.

Bean spots a Postman Pat kiddie ride and puts the baby inside the red van to cheer him up, and inserts nine coins to keep the ride going on so Bean can enjoy the fair. Bean goes on a rollercoaster, but despite the coaster's fast speed, he gets bored and falls asleep on the ride. He then goes to an archery range, but he accidentally shot the employee in the head before running off. He tries his hand with a coin pusher game in an amusement arcade and tries to cheat by repeatedly slapping the machine after running out of coins. He succeeds in releasing many coins from the machine, but gets his comeuppance when a young boy, whom he tried to stop from having a turn earlier, steals his prize. However, one single coin drops from the machine, Bean waves the coin in happiness, only for him to accidentally drop it back into the machine, infuriating him. Meanwhile, a long queue has built up by the kiddie ride. Bean, apparently oblivious to the queue, attempts to put more coins in when an annoyed mother glares at him by complaining to him about how they have been waiting for half an hour, forcing an unamused Bean to remove the baby.

=== Part Two ===
While pushing the baby in his pram, Bean suddenly notices a dirty smell, and eventually realises that the baby needs his nappy changed. Unable to find any fresh nappies in the pram, Bean steals a teddy bear from a little girl after helping her onto a merry-go-round, cuts the stuffing out and uses it as a makeshift nappy for the baby, while carelessly leaving the dirty nappy on a fast-spinning ride, which starts moving and the centrifugal force causes the dirty nappy to be thrown around in the air and end up on various people's faces and a man's toffee apple. The baby cries and Bean tries to calm him with his squeaky toy, while the Doberman he set free earlier on follows the noise (barking each time he squeaks the toy) and gets close to the baby. Though the dog is harmless, Bean lures it into a ticket booth and locks it inside. Bean cheats at a game involving piercing playing cards on a wall with darts by pre-piercing three of his own cards with the darts before throwing them, winning a goldfish. But the fish's water bag leaks, and when a nearby water tap proves to be not working, Bean desperately puts the fish and the remaining water in his mouth in order to keep it alive. With the fish still in his mouth, Bean then plays a round of Bingo. He presses button number 69 and wins, but upon shouting "Bingo!", he reflexively swallows the fish. Fortunately, he manages to spit the goldfish out of his mouth and into a fishbowl with another goldfish; Bean notices this and smiles before leaving.

When the baby cries again, Bean buys several balloons and ties them to the pram. Although these calm the baby, the balloons literally lift the pram up off the ground and into the sky. In panic, Bean steals a bow and arrow from the archery game where he accidentally shot the employee in the head, sharpens the tip of the wooden arrow with a pencil sharpener and fires it, bursting some of the balloons and allowing the pram to softly land exactly in the same place Bean accidentally took it from, where the baby's mother is reporting the disappearance to the police. The mother is reunited with the baby, much to Bean's happiness (though the mother is confused by the baby's teddy bear-shaped nappy). As he watches the happy reunion, Bean realises he forgot to return the squeaky toy, but decides to keep it as a reminder of his little friend. Bean starts to drive home, unaware that the Doberman, having escaped from the ticket booth, has sneaked into the back of his Mini. While driving off, he squeaks the toy once more to make the dog bark, scaring him.

== Cast ==
- Rowan Atkinson as Mr. Bean
- Elliot Henderson-Boyle as the baby
- Susie McKenna as the baby's mother
- Andy Bradford as the bumper car's attendant
- Nick Scott as the man in the booth
- Lydia Henderson-Boyle as the irritated mother
- Anthony Hamblin as the boy at the coin pusher
- Matthew Ashforde as the young man with toffee apple
- Robin Driscoll as the man buying ride tokens
- Vanessa Cherié Guarnera as the girl with the teddy bear
- Zara McDowell as a girl (unknown)

== Production ==
The entire episode was filmed on location at Clarence Pier, Southsea. This is one of only two episodes to be filmed entirely on location with one storyline and the last episode to be directed by Paul Weiland. The other episode-length story, Mr. Bean in Room 426, was also filmed in Southsea. This is also the last episode in the series to be shot on 35mm film.

A clip of the scene where Mr. Bean puts the balloons on the pram, causing it to float upwards was shown in an episode of MythBusters, in which it was tested whether a large number of balloons could indeed lift a small child into the sky. It was proven to be plausible, although a large number of balloons were needed for it to actually work.

=== Casting ===
Matthew Ashforde who played the hotel porter in Mr. Bean in Room 426, returned as the young man with toffee apple.

=== Music ===
"Shakin' All Over", performed by Johnny Kidd & the Pirates, and "Tiger Feet", performed by Mud as well as the Postman Pat theme song (kiddie ride), performed by Ken Barrie are featured in the episode, making it the only episode to feature licensed music.
