= Danny La Rue =

Irish singer and entertainer (1927–2009)

Danny La Rue OBE
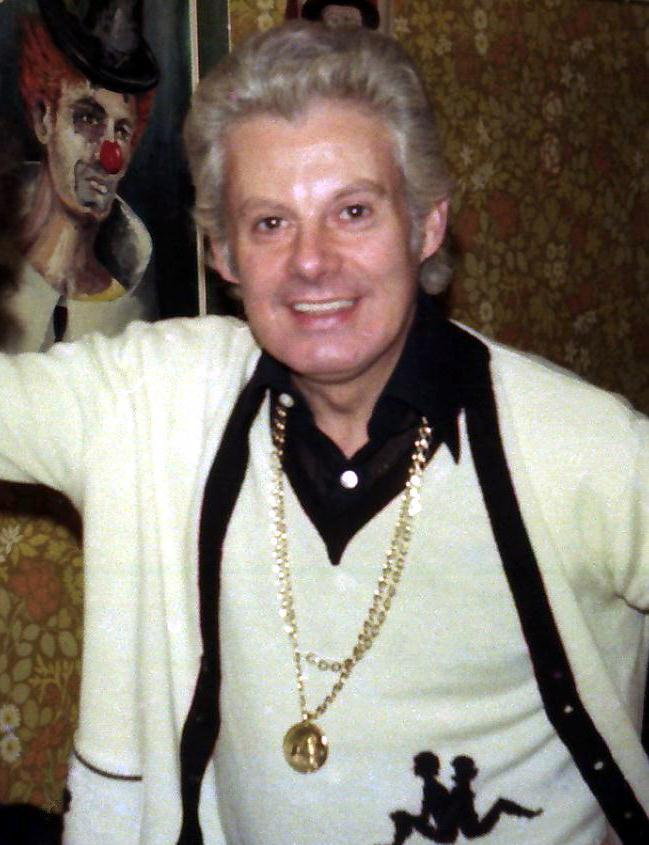
- La Rue in 1975
- Born: Daniel Patrick Carroll; 26 July 1927; Cork, Ireland
- Died: 31 May 2009 (aged 81); Tunbridge Wells, Kent, England
- Burial place: St Mary's Catholic Cemetery, Kensal Green, London, England
- Years active: 1944–2007
- Partner: Jack Hanson (1947–1984)

Danny La Rue OBE (born Daniel Patrick Carroll, 26 July 1927 – 31 May 2009) was an Irish-born entertainer best known for on-stage theatrical productions, television shows and films where he customarily performed as a female impersonator, and often also as himself.

== Early life ==
Born Daniel Patrick Carroll in Cork City, Ireland, in 1927, La Rue was the youngest of five siblings. The family moved to England when he was six and he was brought up at Earnshaw Street in Covent Garden, Central London. When the family home was destroyed during the Blitz, his mother, a seamstress, moved her children to Kennford, a Devon village where young La Rue developed an interest in dramatics. "There weren't enough girls, so I got the pick of the roles ... My Juliet was very convincing," La Rue recalled.

He served in the Royal Navy as a young man, following in his father's footsteps, and for a time worked delivering groceries. He became known as a female impersonator, or "comic in a frock" as he preferred to be called, in the United Kingdom and was featured in theatre productions, and in film, television and records.

== Career ==
Among his celebrity impersonations were Elizabeth Taylor, Zsa Zsa Gabor, Judy Garland, Margot Fonteyn, Marlene Dietrich and Margaret Thatcher. At one point he had his own nightclub in Hanover Square, and also performed in London's West End. In the 1960s, he was among Britain's highest-paid entertainers. In the 1970s, he owned the Swan, an inn at Streatley on the River Thames.

In 1982 he played Dolly Levi in the musical Hello, Dolly!. He also was the only man to take over a woman's role in the West End theatre when he replaced Avis Bunnage in Oh, What a Lovely War! and he was until his death still a regular performer in traditional Christmas pantomime shows in Britain.

In 1968 his version of "On Mother Kelly's Doorstep" reached number 33 in the UK singles chart; La Rue later adopted the song as his theme tune.

He had a starring role in the film Our Miss Fred in 1972, and also appeared in Every Day's a Holiday, The Frankie Howerd Show, Twiggs, Decidedly Dusty, Entertainment Express, Blackpool Bonanza and the BBC's Play of the Month in a production of Charley's Aunt (1969). He made a guest appearance as himself in the Mr. Bean episode "Mr. Bean in Room 426" in 1993.

La Rue's final major public appearance was in Hello Danny, a biographical show performed at the Benidorm Palace, which opened on 11 November 2007. The part of the young La Rue was played by Jerry Lane, who also co-created and directed. La Rue appeared at the start of the show and then in an interview on stage in part of the second half. He also performed a number of songs.

== Personal life ==
La Rue would often perform parts of his show in men's clothes, and was often seen out of female costume on television. In later life he was more candid about his private life, including his homosexuality. La Rue lived with his manager and life partner of 37 years, Jack Hanson, until Hanson's death in 1984.

In 1970, La Rue bought The Swan Inn at Streatley in Berkshire. He was later forced by circumstances to sell it.

In the 1970s, La Rue spent more than £1 million on the purchase and restoration of a country house hotel, Walton Hall, in Warwickshire, and signed it over in 1983, as he could not manage it and his career, to a pair of Canadian con men who had promised further investment and the retention of La Rue's name on the hotel itself. This eventually led to a police investigation where La Rue was cleared of any suspicion but discovered he had lost more than £1 million. The con men had bankrupted La Rue but he insisted on continuing to work to pay off the debts incurred rather than retire.

La Rue owned a silver 1971 Mercedes-Benz 300 SEL 3.5, that sold for £33,750 at an auction in 2018.

== Illness and death ==
La Rue suffered a mild stroke in January 2006 while in Spain on holiday: as a result, his final pantomime and all subsequent performances were cancelled. He had been suffering from prostate cancer for many years. He had several further strokes and developed throat cancer.

He died shortly before midnight on 31 May 2009 at the age of 81. His friend and costume designer Annie Galbraith was with him (he was living at her home in Tunbridge Wells) when he died. La Rue was buried with his late partner Jack Hanson in St Mary's Catholic Cemetery, Kensal Green, west London.

== Accolades ==
He was appointed OBE in the 2002 Queen's Birthday Honours List. La Rue later stated in an interview that this was "the proudest day of his life". Other accolades included Royal Variety Performance appearances in 1969, 1972 and 1978, Variety Club of Great Britain Showbiz Personality of the Year (1969), Theatre Personality of the Year (1970), Entertainer of the Decade (1979) and the Brinsworth Award from the EABF for his outstanding contribution to the entertainment profession and the community. In 1987, he was King Rat of the showbusiness charity the Grand Order of Water Rats.

La Rue was the subject of a specially extended edition of This Is Your Life in 1984 when he was surprised by Eamonn Andrews at the curtain call of Hello, Dolly! at London's Prince of Wales Theatre.

He has also been described as "the grande dame of drag".

== Selected filmography ==
- Our Miss Fred (1972)
- Come Spy with Me (TV film) (1977)
- The Good Old Days (Christmas Eve, 1983)
- Mr. Bean episode, "Mr. Bean in Room 426" (1993)

== Bibliography ==
- La Rue, Danny, Elson Howard (1987) From Drags to Riches: my autobiography, Harmondsworth: Viking, ISBN 0-670-81557-8
- Underwood, Peter (1974) Life's a drag : Danny la Rue & the drag scene, London: Frewin, ISBN 0-85632-081-1
- Baker, Roger (1968) Drag: A History of female impersonation on the stage, Triton: ISBN 0-363-00014-3

== See also ==
- Danny the Street, comic book character named after Danny La Rue ("la rue" in French translates into English as "the street")
