= Queens Hotel, Southsea =

Hotel in Southsea, Hampshire, United Kingdom

Queen's Hotel
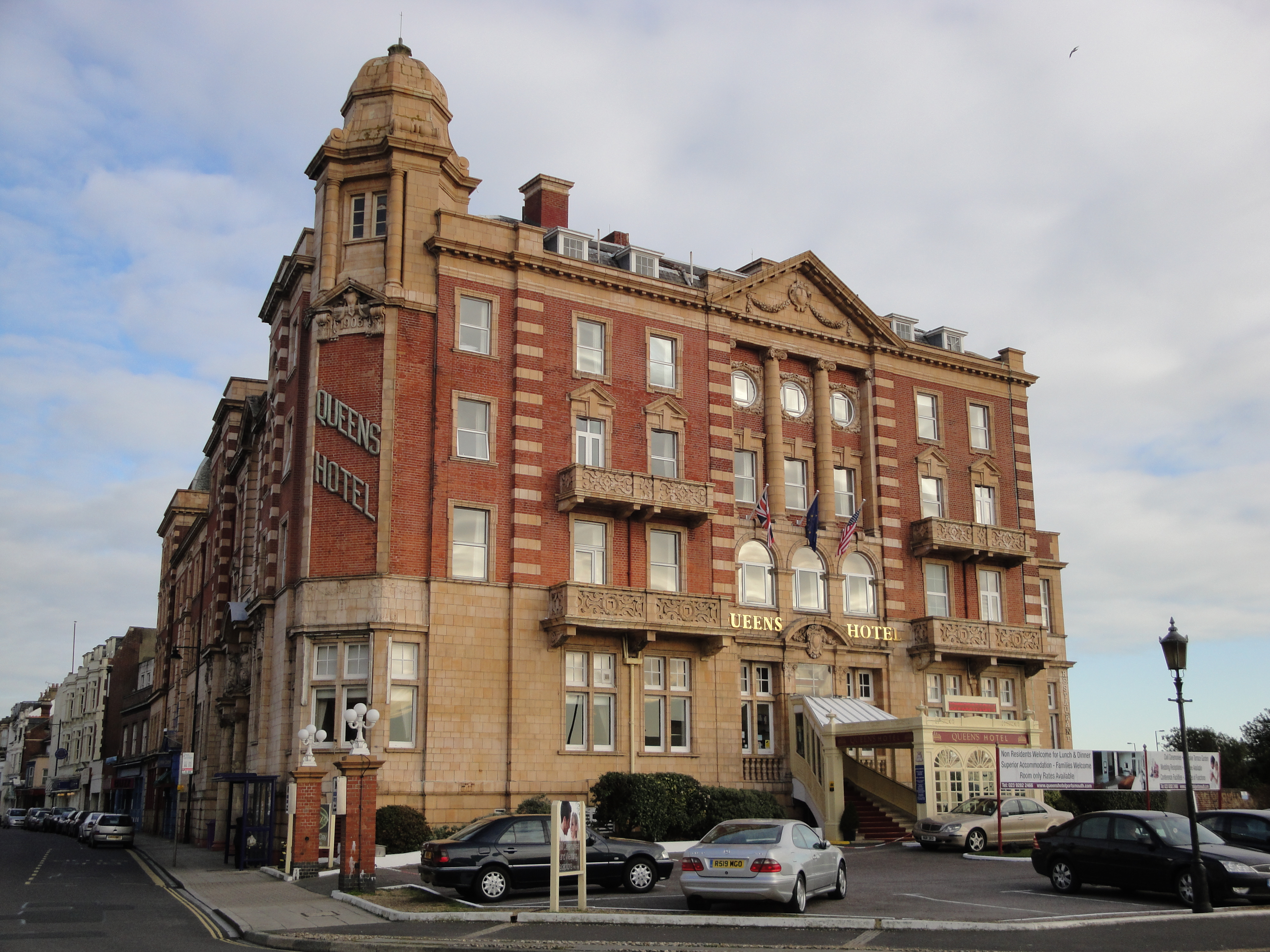

- Location in Hampshire

General information
- Location: Southsea, Hampshire, England
- Coordinates: 50°47′6″N 1°5′35″W
- Opening: 1903; 123 years ago

Design and construction
- Architects: T.W. Cutler; Arthur Blomfield

Website
- https://www.queenshotelportsmouth.com/

The Queen's Hotel is a luxury hotel in Southsea, Portsmouth, Hampshire.

The current Queen's Hotel is placed on the site of Southsea House, built in 1861 by architect Augustus Livesay, which was built for Sir John and Lady Morris. In 1865, due to boom in construction and tourism, Southsea house was converted into the Queen's Hotel by William Kemp Junior. It was one of Portsmouth's first hotels, and it focused on leisure and relaxation for the upper class. At 4:20pm on 8 December 1901, a fire gutted the entire hotel, leaving only the two outer walls that face Osborne Road and Clarence Parade. On 11 December 1901, it was deemed safe to enter the site and two missing chambermaids were discovered, dead, due to being trapped by falling rubble in the basement.

In early 1902, plans were submitted by the hotel owner at the time, G. H. King, to rebuild the hotel to cover the original footprint. The new hotel was to be much grander and more purpose-built, to include 63 rooms for visitors, and 33 for staff. The architect of the rebuild was London-based T.W. Cutler. He was to design the hotel in the Edwardian baroque style in brown terracotta. This was a rising popular style across the British Empire in 1901. Designs were grand and lavish and no expense was spared. The hotel had to be designed to make a statement. The book England describes the hotel as a "Magnificent Edwardian hotel overlooking the Common, with ornate stone-carved balconies and countless neoclassical decorative flourishes". The hotel contains 74 rooms and has two bars and a restaurant.

An episode of Mr. Bean starring Rowan Atkinson, "Mr. Bean in Room 426", was filmed at this hotel in 1992, and was first aired in February 1993.

The hotel was listed at Grade II by Historic England on 20 October 2020.
