= David Stoll (composer) =

English composer and educator

David Michael Stoll (born December 1948) is an English composer and educator.

== Life and career ==
David Stoll was born in London, and studied composition at Worcester College, Oxford University, and at the Royal Academy of Music. After completing his education, he has worked as a freelance composer for concert, theatrical, and TV/film music.

Stoll is a Fellow of the Royal Society of Arts. He served as chairman of the Association of Professional Composers. In 1999 he was elected co-chair of the British Academy of Songwriters, Composers and Authors, and has also served on the boards of several other music organizations. Stoll has run several school and corporate training programs in creative thinking based on music, and founded the In Tune In Europe seminar and Building Music program for primary schools.

== Works ==
Stoll is best known for concert and theater work, but composes production music for film, television, and radio, as well.

Selected works include:

- Cello Concerto, 2000
- The Bowl of Nous, cantata, 1998
- Who, If Not I?, cantata, 1998
- String Quartet, 1998
- Motet in Memoriam for choir
- Midwinter Spring for orchestra
- False Relations, opera, 1997
- Teller of Tales, musical, 1994
- If I Were Lifted from Earth, 1998
- Pericles, theater, 2000
- Gulliver, musical
- Gallions Concerto for clarinet and string orchestra
- Colcester Suite for pipes
- Henry VIII

His music has been recorded and issued on media including:

- The Shakespeare Suite, audio CD
- String Quartets, audio CD
- David Stoll: Reflections on Vedic Scriptures, 1993, audio CD
- Stoll: Chamber Music, audio CD
