= The Best Bits of Mr. Bean =

- Mr. Bean episode
- Directed by: John Howard Davies
- Written by: Flashbacks: Rowan Atkinson; Richard Curtis; Robin Driscoll; with Ben Elton
- Original air date: 21 October 1996
- Running time: 72:00

"The Best Bits of Mr. Bean" is the compilation special of the British television series Mr. Bean, produced by Tiger Aspect Productions and Thames Television for Central Independent Television. It was first released as a VHS-exclusive on 21 October 1996.

== Plot ==
During a rainy day, Mr. Bean and Teddy venture into the attic to look for an umbrella so they can go to the park and feed the ducks. He sticks a tiny drink umbrella into Teddy's head, but finds that his own umbrella is broken. While looking for another one, Bean uncovers various items from his past adventures, like the time Bean had to dress himself on the way to the dentist, the time he fell asleep in church, when he had a Christmas turkey stuck on his head and even the time a tank crushed his Mini. When he finally finds an umbrella, he looks out the window to find that the rain has stopped. Bean angrily leaves the attic as a boomerang he threw out the window earlier finally lands on the roof.

== Alternate version ==
The original transmission of this episode ran for 72 minutes, but later releases and TV broadcasts starting from 2010 were cut to 52 minutes under the heading The Best of Mr. Bean. Clips deleted from the later edits included Bean helping a busker in "The Return of Mr. Bean", Bean trying to stay awake in church and sitting in an exam from the pilot episode, as well as unshown footage of Bean accidentally pulling his television aerial cable and lifting the television up from the floor below, before he lets go and it smashes. However, the original uncut version can be found on most pre-2010 video releases of the series.

== Production ==
John Howard Davies, producer and director of the first three episodes, returned to direct this final episode. Davies was also head of light entertainment at Thames Television when the pilot episode was commissioned in 1989.

Both versions of the choral theme tune are heard—the version by the choir of Southwark Cathedral for the opening titles and the version by the Choir of Christ Church Cathedral, Oxford for the closing credits.
