= Back to School Mr. Bean =

- Mr. Bean episode
- The full episode
- Episode no.: Episode 11
- Directed by: John Birkin
- Written by: Robin Driscoll; Rowan Atkinson
- Original air date: 26 October 1994
- Running time: 24:18

Guest appearances
- David Schneider; John Barrard; Christopher Ryan; Rupert Bates

Episode chronology
← Previous "Mind the Baby, Mr. Bean"	Next → "Tee Off, Mr. Bean"

"Back to School Mr. Bean" is the eleventh episode of the British television series Mr. Bean, produced by Tiger Aspect Productions and Thames Television for Central Independent Television. It was first broadcast on ITV on Wednesday, 26 October 1994 and was watched by 14,450,000 viewers during its original broadcast.

== Plot ==
=== Part One ===
Mr. Bean attends an open day at a local school. While looking for a place to park his Mini, he spots a near-identical Mini in a reserved parking space and replaces it with his own. He then confuses a troop of cadets by giving them commands, which cause them to stand in an unusual stance; the commander scolds the troop upon his return. Inside the school, Bean touches a Van de Graaff generator that leaves his body electrostatically charged, causing a pamphlet to stick to his shoe. When he gives the pamphlet to a nearby woman, her skirt rises up, prompting Bean to exit the scene.

=== Part Two ===
In the chemistry lab, Bean experiments with numerous chemicals and causes an explosion that generates a lot of blue smoke. He then joins an art class and starts drawing a bowl of fruit, but the bowl is soon replaced with a nude model, much to Bean's shock. Bean makes clay pots at the potter's wheel and places them on the model's breasts, allowing him to draw her without feeling embarrassed.

During a judo class, Bean overtakes the instructor by pushing him to the ground and rolling him up in a mat. Upon changing back into his regular attire, Bean finds that he is wearing another person's trousers and searches for his own. He finds a man in the restroom wearing them and forcibly pulls the trousers off the man's legs.

Bean then leaves the school and notices his Mini in the car park, but stops to buy a cupcake from a cake stall. As he eats the cupcake, a giant Chieftain tank crushes his Mini as part of a demonstration. Upon realising what has happened, Bean drops his cupcake and tearfully walks toward the wreckage, only to find that the Mini's padlock is unharmed. He smiles and walks away.

=== Extended Scenes ===
==== Marching ====
Mr. Bean is ready to go inside, but suddenly, an army of men are marching to him. He tries to escape through a door, but it is looked. He asks a person inside to help him, just as the army men are almost at Mr. Bean they turn around and march away. Then Mr. Bean walks off too, and tells the person at the door everything is ok and now he doesn't need help.

===== Playing With Matches =====
Someone is putting glue on matches for a display. Mr. Bean hands him a match, but it is on fire. The man quickly blows it out, as Mr. Bean runs away.

=== Continuity ===
While Bean's Mini is crushed in this episode, he is shown to have obtained a new one in "Goodnight Mr Bean". It is possible that this is the identical Mini he had displaced earlier in this episode, and that Bean stole it for himself. In "The Best Bits of Mr. Bean", Bean finds parts of his destroyed Mini in his loft.

== Cast ==
- Rowan Atkinson as Mr. Bean
- Suzanne Bertish as the art teacher
- Cindy Milo as the nude model in the art class
- Sam Driscoll as the boy in the chemistry lab
- Christopher Ryan as a judo student
- Lucy Fleming as the angry teacher with the boy
- David Schneider as the judo instructor
- Harriet Eastcott as the young electrocuted woman
- Christopher Driscoll as the man in the school corridor
- John Clegg as the calligrapher
- John Barrard as the stamp collector
- Al Ashton as ACF Drill Instructor
- Robin Driscoll as a man in the school (uncredited)

== Production ==
There were three cars crushed during filming. Two cars were specifically built for filming this episode and were painted with the same colour scheme as the main car; but with the engines removed. One of these two Minis was also used for the part where Mr. Bean substitutes his car with the identical car. One of the three main cars with the engine removed was also crushed by the tank.
