= Mr. Bean Rides Again =

- Mr. Bean episode
- A free depiction of the episode, from YouTube under the CC BY 3.0 licence.
- Episode no.: Episode 6
- Directed by: Paul Weiland (film sequences); John Birkin (studio)
- Written by: Robin Driscoll; Richard Curtis; Rowan Atkinson
- Original air date: 17 February 1992
- Running time: 24:30 (original transmission); 28:33 (inclusion of deleted scene)

Guest appearances
- Roger Sloman (Heart Attack Man); Su Douglas (lady with letter); John Rolfe (Postman); Matilda Ziegler (Woman with Baby in Pram); Robin Driscoll (Blind Man); Nick Hancock (Train conductor); Stephen Frost (Laughing Man); Hugo Mendez (Boy on Plane); Eryl Maynard (Air Hostess)

Episode chronology
← Previous "The Trouble with Mr. Bean"	Next → "Merry Christmas, Mr. Bean"

"Mr. Bean Rides Again" is the sixth episode of the British television series Mr. Bean, produced by Tiger Television for Thames Television. It was first broadcast on ITV on 17 February 1992. and was watched by 17.11 million viewers during its original transmission.

== Plot ==
=== Act 1: The Man With a Heart Attack and the Postbox ===
Mr. Bean goes out to post a letter. After using a series of keys to retrieve his car's ignition key, he discovers that the battery is flat, so he decides to take the bus. When he reaches the bus stop, the man already waiting there has a heart attack, terrifying Bean, who then tries to revive him by stomping on him, stuffing pills down his throat, trying mouth-to-mouth resuscitation and giving electric shock treatment using jump leads connected to a lamp post. The electric shock treatment initially works, but Bean is still holding the leads when the man offers him a handshake, and he is shocked and knocked unconscious again. An ambulance arrives, and while the paramedics treat the man, Bean uses the ambulance battery to jump start his Mini. Bean drives off and leaves the ambulance disabled due to a dead battery.

Bean heads to a postbox, but accidentally swallows his postage stamp while driving. He offers to post a letter for a lady struggling with full hands, but holds it in the pillar box slot as she walks away. He removes the stamp using steam from his car radiator and sticks it to his letter using a boiled sweet stuck in his pocket (as it will not stick with a lick). The postman arrives just as the lady returns to find her letter on the ground, missing its stamp. She complains to the postman, while Bean hides inside the postbox to avoid being caught, but ends up locked inside, apparently overnight. He calls for help and sticks his tie out of the slot, but is unnoticed except by a dog who pulls on his tie. After finally getting released (by another postman), Bean accidentally drops his car keys down a drain and is forced to get a bus home, waiting at the bus stop with another man. The man gets on the bus, but Bean cannot as all the seats are full, forcing Bean to wait for the next one.

=== Act 2: The Holiday ===
At his bedsit, Bean packs for a holiday but he finds that his small briefcase does not have enough space for his clothes and food. He reduces the size of his belongings, often with scissors, to fit them into the case — such as a pair of trousers into shorts (before realising he already has one), breaking his toothbrush, pouring some toothpaste down the sink, taking just one sandal and packing a flannel instead of a towel, but does not have the heart to cut up Teddy. After packing everything in his small case, he reaches under the bed, only to discover that he has a larger case. However, because his small briefcase is already full, he just puts it into the larger suitcase, along with one other thing he couldn’t pack — a book.

Bean rides a train and reads the book, sitting across from another man who is also reading. When the man reaches a funny moment in his book, he begins laughing loudly, distracting Bean. Bean attempts to read his book in peace, muffling his ears to avoid the laughter, garnering strange gazes when the man looks up. He finds some chewing gum under the carriage seats, pushes it into his ears and thus, blocks out the noise. Finally, the train guard comes in and asks to check their tickets. Bean, inattentive but unexpectedly startled by his presence, accidentally throws his book with his ticket tucked inside as a bookmark out of the train window, causing the man to burst out laughing once more.

Eventually, Bean boards an aeroplane, but he is forced to look after a sick boy next to him. He tries to cheer the boy up through various means: by sticking magazine bits on his face, playing with a self-inflating life jacket (it later flies out of Bean's seat), pretending to vomit and by blowing into a paper bag and trying to pop it. Realising the bag has holes in it, he starts searching for another empty bag. While his back is turned and the plane experiences turbulence, the boy vomits into a sickness bag and offers the bag to Bean. He unknowingly takes and pops the bag between his hands, as the episode abruptly ends with the sound of the pop, leaving the outcome ambiguous.

== Cast ==
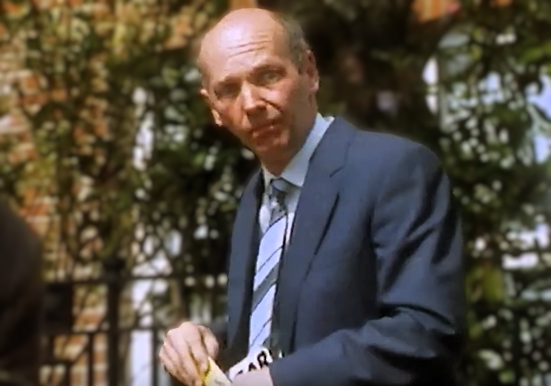
Roger Sloman as the heart attack man

- Rowan Atkinson as Mr. Bean
- Roger Sloman as the heart attack man
- Su Douglas as the lady with the letter
- John Rolfe as the postman
- Stephen Frost as the laughing man
- Nick Hancock as the train guard
- Eryl Maynard as the air hostess
- Hugo Mendez as the young boy

== Deleted scene ==
A deleted scene has appeared as a standalone sketch, titled "The Bus Stop", in some video releases.

After losing the keys to his mini down a drain, Bean decides to catch a bus instead. After arriving at the bus stop, the conductor turns Bean away as the bus is full. Bean is determined to be the first in the queue for the next bus, and tries to push in front of a woman (Matilda Ziegler) with a baby in a pram, who gets in line ahead of Bean when he steps away to post a letter, and a blind man (Robin Driscoll) who pushes in without knowing. After Bean eventually manages to get to the front again by devious means, several people join the end of the line, and the bus arrives.

Unfortunately for Bean, the bus does not stop in front of him. It drives on for another few yards, such that the door of the bus (which is at the back) is closest to the back of the queue, effectively reversing the queue's order. Bean is thus left at the back and is again turned away due to the bus reaching capacity, forcing him to wait for yet another bus.

== Production ==
Location sequences for this episode were mostly shot on 35 mm film at Dalgarno Gardens in Kensington and studio sequences were recorded before a live audience at Thames Television's Teddington Studios.

The end credits of this episode is one of two to perform a volte-face: showing the reverse of the opening titles where Mr. Bean is sucked back into the sky, and the only one to do so with the street scenery. This is the last episode to feature the name of the episode in the first opening sequence. In later episodes, the main title of "Mr. Bean" is displayed. The episode title is then displayed once the episode starts.

=== Casting ===
- Roger Sloman, who played the blind man in the pilot episode, returned as the heart attack man.
- Nick Hancock, who played the camera thief in "Mr. Bean Goes to Town", returned as the train guard.
- Hugo Mendez, who played the boy playing with the radio-controlled boat model in "The Trouble with Mr. Bean", returned as the sick boy.
- Stephen Frost, who played the laughing man, previously co-starred with Rowan Atkinson in "Witchsmeller Pursuivant", the fifth episode of The Black Adder, and in "Corporal Punishment", the second episode of Blackadder Goes Forth.
