= Hair by Mr. Bean of London =

- Mr. Bean episode
- Episode no.: Episode 14
- Directed by: John Birkin
- Written by: Robin Driscoll; Rowan Atkinson
- Original air dates: 15 November 1995 (direct-to-video release); 13 August 2006 (TV)
- Running time: 26:15

Guest appearances
- Chris Driscoll; Tony Haase; Colin Wells; Frederick Treves; George Webb

Episode chronology
← Previous "Goodnight Mr. Bean"	Next → —

"Hair by Mr. Bean of London" is the fourteenth and finale episode of the British television series Mr. Bean, produced by Tiger Aspect Productions in association with Thames Video in 1995. It was first released on VHS as an exclusive direct-to-video episode on 15 November 1995, and was not broadcast on television in the United Kingdom until eleven years later, on 13 August 2006.

== Plot ==
=== Act 1: The Barbershop ===
Mr. Bean visits a barber shop and assumes the role of a barber while the real one is on the phone. A boy arrives and Bean gives him a bowl cut, but accidentally cuts off part of the boy's hair and ends up shaving a large gap in the middle. The next customers have it just as bad; Bean cuts off the first one's ponytail and shaves off the second one's toupée. When the real barber gets off the phone, the customers angrily confront him, wanting to know where his "assistant" is. Bean sneaks away, hiding his face with a calendar of Prince Charles.

=== Act 2: The Fête and the Pet Show ===
Bean attends a fête and parks his Mini in one of the sheep pens. He cheats at several indoor games, including "Hit the Headmaster." He later enters Teddy in a pet show and Teddy wins. Bean is awarded a large bone as a prize, but he discards it and opts for a jar of honey instead; a fight over the bone ensues between the children and dogs in the tent as Bean escapes, going back once to retrieve Teddy's cage.

=== Act 3: The Railway Station ===
Bean disembarks from a train at St Pancras railway station and realises that he has lost his ticket. He tries to sneak past a security guard while hiding inside a mail bag. When the guard leaves, Bean climbs onto a gate, but two men turn the gate around. Bean crawls off the gate and ends up falling onto the railway tracks. Two workers appear and place the mailbag (with Bean still inside) on board a train carrying cargo destined for Moscow. The credits play over footage of a ship sailing through a rough sea, a French steam train, and a group of soldiers marching in Red Square, implying that Bean indeed ended up in Russia.

== Cast ==
- Rowan Atkinson as Mr. Bean
- Tony Haase as Derrick (barber)
- Chris Driscoll as Derrick's customer
- Colin Wells as the man with a ponytail
- Frederick Treves as the Colonel
- George Webb as the headmaster
- Robin Driscoll as the railway station security guard
- C.J. Allen as Roger
- Susie McKenna as Jamie's mum
- Jamie Yeates as Jamie
- Matthew Ashforde

== Production ==
As per the other episodes, studio sequences were recorded before a live audience at Teddington Studios.

On the door of the railway coach next to the English inscription of "MOSCOW", some mock Cyrillic writing is visible "НПУЛЦА" (npultsa) instead of "МОСКВА". During the end credits, the footage shown of Red Square was taken in the former Soviet Union despite this episode having premiered almost 4 years after its dissolution. Co-writer Robin Driscoll made a cameo appearance as the railway guard—his first credited appearance since "Mr. Bean Goes to Town". The original recording of the choral theme by the Choir of Southwark Cathedral, was used in the opening titles. However, the end credits incorrectly credited it to the Choir of Christ Church Cathedral, Oxford.

Act 1 inspired the Mr. Bean: The Animated Series episode "Haircut", while Act 2 inspired the Mr. Bean: The Animated Series episode "Scrapper Cleans Up". A train scene inspired by Act 3 was featured in the film Mr. Bean's Holiday.

== Broadcast ==
"Hair by Mr. Bean of London" was first released on VHS in 1995 as a video exclusive and until 2006, it was the only episode never to air on any British television network. This episode was broadcast overseas and received its Irish premiere on RTÉ One in 2005—it also aired on ABC in Australia in August 2001 and on TV3 in New Zealand in November 2001..

The episode was first screened on United Kingdom television on 13 August 2006, when it was shown on satellite, pay TV and cable channel Comedy Central Extra (then known as Paramount Comedy 2) and 25 August 2006 on Nickelodeon UK but for some time, it remained the only full-length episode not to air on ITV. It has since been broadcast on ITV3 and ITV4.
