= Mr. Bean Goes to Town =

- Mr. Bean episode
- Episode no.: Episode 4
- Directed by: Paul Weiland (film sequences); John Birkin (studio)
- Written by: Robin Driscoll; Richard Curtis; Rowan Atkinson
- Original air date: 15 October 1991
- Running time: 23:58

Guest appearances
- Nick Hancock; Robin Driscoll; Dursley McLinden; Matilda Ziegler; Alan Shaxon; Julia Howson; Richard Marcangelo; Howard Goodall; Mark Khan; Phil Nice

Episode chronology
← Previous "The Curse of Mr. Bean"	Next → "The Trouble with Mr. Bean"

"Mr. Bean Goes to Town" is the fourth episode of the British television series Mr. Bean, produced by Tiger Television for Thames Television. It was first broadcast on ITV on 15 October 1991 and was watched by 14.42 million viewers during its original transmission.

This was the first episode to be produced and broadcast in NICAM Stereo and the first to be overseen by a new production team – directors John Birkin and Paul Weiland (working on studio and location sequences respectively) and producer Sue Vertue. It was also the first episode to introduce the familiar "street" version of the title sequence.

== Plot ==
=== Act 1: The Television ===
Mr. Bean has just bought himself a portable television. After unpacking it and setting it up on a low table, Bean inserts the plug into a socket and wonders why it will not switch on, only to realise he forgot to wire the plug. Upon doing so by screwing the cable into the plug, plugging in the aerial and turning on the television, he discovers he gets no reception regardless of where he moves the aerial to. When he puts the aerial on the floor and sits on a chair in a particular spot, the television suddenly gets reception, but only if it is not facing him. He tries bending over to see the screen but loses reception when he turns his head to face it. No matter what he does, he cannot get reception with the screen in his line of sight. Ingeniously, he decides to take off all his clothes and assemble them on the chair to resemble himself, and this eventually works when he includes his underwear in the assembly (using the television's cardboard box to cover himself). Unfortunately, just as Bean sits down to watch the television, his prepaid electricity meter runs out and cuts off the power, much to his annoyance.

=== Act 2: The Camera Thief ===
Later that day, Bean heads out to Battersea Park to try out his new Polaroid camera with the Three Standing Figures. Unable to get a clear selfie, Bean asks a passerby (Nick Hancock) to take his photo, but the man tricks Bean and flees with the camera. Upon realising what happened, Bean seeks the thief out, eventually trapping him in a rubbish bin and poking him with a pencil, but the thief escapes just as Bean alerts a passing police officer (Matilda Ziegler) to the incident. At the police station, Bean tries to identify the thief in a police lineup but asks the police sergeant (Robin Driscoll) to make a slight alteration after having difficulty identifying the thief by requesting the men in the lineup have rubbish bins over their heads. Using his pencil, Bean jabs each one until he hears the culprit's scream of pain that he recalls, effectively identifying him to the police.

=== Act 3: The Shoe & The Evening Date ===
While heading through town, Bean feels an itch in his foot. To relieve the itch, he removes his shoe and sock and places them on the roof of a parked car, only for it to drive off with them. Bean finds himself forced to hop through town trying to find them, briefly stopping in a shop to find a shoe that matches his own but being unable to buy just one shoe when the salesman insists that he must buy the pair. After spotting the car, Bean jumps in front of it, forcing it to stop and causing his shoe and sock to fall off and into his grasp, and leaving him to thank the driver.

Walking through town at night, Bean attempts to comb his hair in a shop window but has difficulty combing the back of his head. To resolve the problem, he uses an ID photo booth to photograph the back of his head, before heading off to a nightclub called "Club Phut" (the word was previously seen as graffiti at the start of "The Return of Mr. Bean"), meeting up with his girlfriend Irma Gobb (also played by Ziegler). Inside, the pair enter the stage area where a magic act is being performed by a magician named Eddie Spangle. Raising his arm to try to attract the attention of a waitress, Bean inadvertently becomes a volunteer in the magic show. The magician takes Bean's watch for a trick, leading him to ruin the show searching for it, much to Irma's embarrassment and disgrace. Upon retrieving it, but seeing Irma gone, Bean heads out and into the club's dance floor while Spangle angrily searches for him after he ruined his show.

Inside the disco, Bean finds Irma dancing with another man. Jealous, Bean tries to butt in and take back Irma, who ignores him again and simply continues dancing with the other man, eventually leading Bean to force the man out of the disco. Hoping to get Irma to dance with him, Bean asks the DJ to change the music to something slow and romantic, only to find that the man has returned and is embracing Irma. Heartbroken and humiliated, Bean exits the disco, but unwilling to be beaten, he spots the club's power breaker and shuts it off on his way out, leaving the club in darkness.

In the ending scene, in a homage to the opening segment, on his way home, Bean passes a shop with several televisions in its window display, which go to static when he walks past them and return to normal after he has passed, and do the same when he sticks his hand in front of them after the ending credits.

== Cast ==
- Rowan Atkinson as Mr. Bean
- Matilda Ziegler as Irma Gobb and the policewoman
- Nick Hancock as the camera thief
- Robin Driscoll as the police sergeant
- Dursley McLinden as the shoe salesman
- Alan Shaxon as Eddie Spangle
- Julia Howson as Monique
- Richard Marcangelo and Howard Goodall as musicians
- Mark Khan and Phil Nice as disco dancers

== Production ==
The day after the original transmission of this episode, Thames Television, which originally commissioned and broadcast the series on behalf of the ITV network, learned it would lose its broadcast franchise at the end of the following year. As an independent production company, Thames continued its involvement with the series after 1992 but the network commission and compliance responsibility was handed over to Central Television, who also oversaw a number of Thames' independent productions for the ITV network.

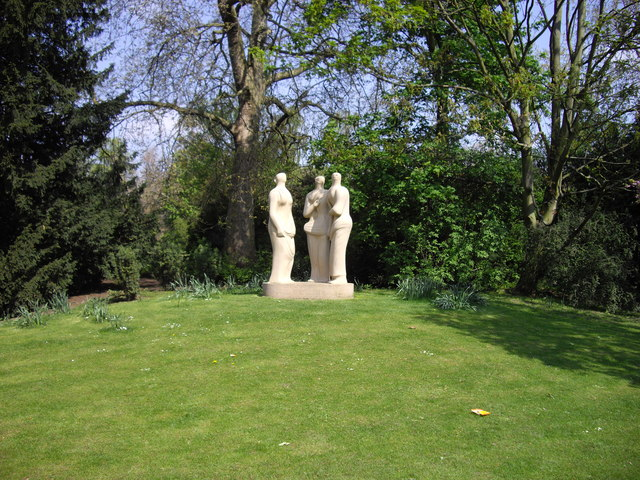
The "Three Standing Figures" sculpture in Battersea Park

The location sequences in this episode were filmed at Battersea Park and Kingston upon Thames. Exterior scenes outside Mr. Bean's flat were filmed in Surbiton for several episodes in the series. The location scenes also switched from using OB videotape to 35 mm film. Studio sequences were recorded before a live audience at Thames Television's Teddington Studios.
