= The Trouble with Mr. Bean =

- Mr. Bean episode
- Episode no.: Episode 5
- Directed by: Paul Weiland (film sequences); John Birkin (studio)
- Written by: Robin Driscoll; Richard Curtis; Rowan Atkinson
- Original air date: 1 January 1992
- Running time: 25:23

Guest appearances
- Richard Wilson; Caroline Quentin; Sam Mead; Christine Ellerbeck; Hugo Mendez; Michael Godley; Nathan Lewis; Bridget Brammall

Episode chronology
← Previous "Mr. Bean Goes to Town"	Next → "Mr. Bean Rides Again"

"The Trouble with Mr. Bean" is the fifth episode of the British television series Mr. Bean, produced by Tiger Television for Thames Television. It was first broadcast on ITV on 1 January 1992 and watched by 18.74 million viewers on its original broadcast, making it the highest-rated episode in the series.

== Plot ==
=== Part One ===
Mr. Bean sets multiple alarms for 8:00 am, but sleeps through all of them. He eventually wakes up at 8:50 and notices a reminder for his 9:00 dental appointment. Quickly, he gathers his clothes, toothbrush, and toothpaste before rushing out to his Mini. While driving to the appointment, Bean gets dressed and brushes his teeth, using the car's screenwash to rinse. He then spits out the toothpaste and it lands on the backside of another man, who assumes it is bird droppings.

Arriving at Dr. Peggitt's dental clinic, Bean forces the blue Reliant out of the only parking space. He then sits in the waiting room and tricks a boy into leaving to steal his Batman comic book. Once in the dentist's room, Bean meddles with the equipment and inadvertently knocks Peggitt unconscious by injecting him with anaesthetic. Bean attempts to fill his own tooth, but ends up gluing his jaw shut with dental composite. His jaws are freed when Peggitt wakes up and startles him.

=== Part Two ===
Bean drives to the public park to have a picnic. While passing by a lake, he spots a young boy having difficulty with his remote-controlled boat, so he opens up the controller and tweaks the circuitry inside. Unbeknownst to Bean and, the controller also takes control of a nearby man's electric wheelchair. Bean hands the controller back to the boy and leaves just as the wheelchair approaches the latter from behind, knocking him into the lake.

Bean soon begins setting up his picnic. Unbeknownst to him, a car thief breaks into his Mini and hotwires it, only to find the steering wheel is missing; Bean has removed it and has it with him in his picnic basket. As Bean prepares to eat his meal, a wasp buzzes around him. He defeats the wasp, but attracts a whole swarm of them, forcing him to abandon his picnic. Bean tosses his cake into a nearby car, unaware that the car thief is inside; the thief soon finds himself being targeted by the swarm.

== Cast ==
- Rowan Atkinson as Mr. Bean
- Richard Wilson as Mr. A. M. Peggit, the dentist
- Caroline Quentin as the traffic warden
- Sam Mead as the schoolboy
- Christine Ellerbeck as the schoolboy's mother
- Hugo Mendez as the boy in the park
- Michael Godley as the man in a wheelchair
- Nathan Lewis as the car thief
- Bridget Brammall as the dental nurse

== Production ==
Location scenes for this episode were shot on 35mm in Battersea Park, Kingston and Teddington, close to the Thames TV studios where studio sequences were recorded before a live audience.

An extended upbeat remix of the choral theme was used for the driving sequence in Act 1.

A number of inspired scenes and stories in Mr. Bean: The Animated Series:

- The scene at the dentist inspired the story for the episode called "Toothache".
- The scene between Mr. Bean and the wasp inspired a similar event for the episode "Artful Bean". The same scene inspired a 2022 Netflix series Man vs. Bee starring Atkinson as a house sitter.
- The scene in which Mr. Bean got his shaver stuck on his nasal hair was reused for the episode "Wanted".
- The scene in which Mr. Bean stopped his coffeemaker waking him by plugging up the hose attached to it that sprayed hot water onto his feet was adapted as part of a scene in clock "Birthday Bear".

A diagram of the clock and hose invention in this episode, also featured in the book Mr Bean's Diary, released in 1993.

The Batman comic book held by the boy in Act 1 is Batman Volume 1, Issue 463.
