= John Rolfe (actor) =

British actor (1935–2020)

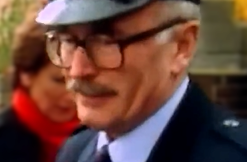
- Rolfe in "Mr. Bean Rides Again" (1992)
- Born: 25 March 1935; Lewisham, London, England
- Died: 12 August 2020 (aged 85); Ross-on-Wye, Herefordshire, England
- Occupation: Actor

John Richard Rolfe (25 March 1935 – 12 August 2020) was a British actor. He was named after the colonist who married Pocahontas in Jamestown, Virginia.

His stage work includes appearances at the Bristol Old Vic and with the RSC. His television credits include: Z-Cars, Dixon of Dock Green, Adam Adamant Lives!, The First Lady, Softly, Softly, Doctor Who (in the serials The War Machines, The Moonbase and The Green Death), Paul Temple, The Troubleshooters, Out of the Unknown, The Regiment, Spy Trap, Warship, Oil Strike North, Survivors, Blake's 7, Minder, Secret Army, The Enigma Files, Yes Minister, One by One, Howards' Way and The House of Eliott. He did the first, moustached and spectacled postman in "Mr. Bean Rides Again" (he played the postman seen before Mr. Bean got locked in the letterbox after he stole a lady's stamp for his own letter). He also played Graham in the 1980 film McVicar, starring Roger Daltrey. In 1994 he guest starred in The Bill.

== Filmography ==
=== Film ===
Film
| Year | Title | Role | Notes |
|---|---|---|---|
| 1952 | Head in Shadow | —N/a | Short film Producer |
| 1953 | Agib and Agab | | Short film |
| 1954 | Seagulls Over Sorrento | Wireless Operator | Uncredited; Also known as Crest of the Wave |
| 1980 | McVicar | Graham | |

=== Television ===
Television
| Year | Title | Role | Notes |
|---|---|---|---|
| 1962 | Emergency Ward 10 | Paul Wright | 3 episodes |
| 1962 | The River Flows East | Gordon | Episode 3 |
| 1962 | Maigret | Receptionist | Series 3, episode 10: "Death in Mind" |
| 1962-1963 | The Old Curiosity Shop | Jacob Owl | Miniseries; 3 episodes |
| 1962-1963 | Suspense | Reporter | 2 episodes |
| 1962-1974 | Z-Cars | George Smethurst / Tom Ballard / Various | 6 episodes |
| 1963 | Moonstrike | Anton | 2 episodes |
| 1963-1975 | Dixon of Dock Green | Robson / Frank Wilson / Jackson / Joe Gillespie / John Baldwin / Various | 10 episodes |
| 1964 | Compact | Studio Manager | Episode 223: "In the Air" |
| 1964 | Detective | Constable Barker | Series 1, episode 2: "The Drawing" |
| 1964-1965 | Play of the Week | First gentleman / Radner | 2 episodes |
| 1964-1965 | Cluff | Detective Constable Barker | 19 episodes |
| 1966 | Adam Adamant Lives! | Kelvin | Series 1, episode 2: "Death Has a Thousand Faces" |
| 1966-1973 | Doctor Who | Sam / Fell / Captain | 8 episodes |
| 1968-1976 | The Expert | Dr. Muir / Tom Fanshaw | 2 episodes |
| 1969 | Softly, Softly | Irons | Series 4, episode 17: "Departure" |
| 1969 | The First Lady | Walker | Series 2, episode 16: "The Whips Are Out" |
| 1969 | Counterstrike | Dr. Ferris | Episode 7: "The Lemming Syndrome" |
| 1969-1970 | Paul Temple | Jenkins / Sergeant Dashford | 2 episodes |
| 1970 | Special Branch | Shelby | Series 2, episode 2: "Dinner Date" |
| 1971 | A Family at War | R.E. Officer | Series 2, episode 11: "Hazard" |
| 1971 | Shadows of Fear | Man | Episode 7: "The Lesser of Two" |
| 1971 | Out of the Unknown | Rawlinson | Series 4, episode 3: "This Body Is Mine" |
| 1971 | The Troubleshooters | Tanker Officer | Series 7, episode 6: "A Touch of the Nelsons" |
| 1972 | The Man Outside | Codron | Episode 12: "Mandala" |
| 1972 | The Man Who Was Hunting Himself | Detective Inspector Pearson | Episode 2 |
| 1972 | The Regiment | Captain Robins | Series 2, episode 6: "Cholera" |
| 1972-1973 | Spy Trap | Harvey / Doctor | 2 episodes |
| 1973 | Sykes | Newspaper Reporter | Series 2, episode 8: "Window Smasher" |
| 1974 | Hunter's Walk | John Dix | Series 2, episode 3: "Villain" |
| 1974 | Masquerade | Host | Episode 4: "Something Down There Is Crying" |
| 1974 | Playhouse | Daniels | Series 8, episode 1: "The Gift of Friendship" |
| 1974 | The Brothers | Haughton | Series 4, episode 9: "The Race" |
| 1974 | The Chinese Puzzle | Bill Jameson | 6 episodes |
| 1975 | The Fight Against Slavery | Counsel | Miniseries; Episode 3: "A Matter of Insurance" |
| 1975 | Oil Strike North | Burton | Episode 7: "It Depends Where You Stand" |
| 1975 | Poldark | Magistrate | Episode #1.5 |
| 1976 | Hadleigh | Thompson | Series 4, episode 13: "Broke" |
| 1976 | The Crezz | Airline Man | Episode 6: "Voices from the Past" |
| 1976 | Brensham People | Solicitor | Episode 3: "William Hart, Wainwright" |
| 1976-1983 | Rentaghost | Mr. Saunders / Mr. Green | 2 episodes |
| 1977 | The Phoenix and the Carpet | Policeman | Episode 5: "The Phoenix and the Carpet" |
| 1977 | Warship | Lodge | Series 4, episode 6: "A Matter of History" |
| 1977 | Survivors | Summers | Series 3, episode 1: "Manhunt" |
| 1977 | Seven Faces of Woman | Director | Series 2, episode 2: "She: Sight Unseen" |
| 1977 | Don't Forget to Write! | Vegetable Judge | Series 1, episode 3: "The Tasting of the Wine" |
| 1978 | BBC2 Play of the Week | Other Man | Series 1, episode 11: "Mr. & Ms. Bureaucrat" |
| 1978 | Blake's 7 | Terloc | Series 1, episode 9: "Project Avalon" |
| 1978 | The Onedin Line | Mr. Andrews | Series 6, episode 3: "Double Dealers" |
| 1978 | The Sweeney | Det. Chief Supt. Brookford | Series 4, episode 3: "Drag Act" |
| 1978 | Return of the Saint | Doland | Episode 7: "Yesterday's Hero" |
| 1978 | Lillie | Mr. O'Brien | Episode 11: "Mr. Jersey" |
| 1978 | Secret Army | Weikmann | Series 2, episode 13: "Day of Wrath" |
| 1979 | Danger UXB | Fire Officer | Episode 2: "Unsung Heroes" |
| 1979 | Dick Barton: Special Agent | Whiteson | 3 episodes |
| 1979 | Last of the Summer Wine | Man in Pub | Series 5, episode 5: "Earnshaw Strikes Again" |
| 1979 | Angels | Mr. Johnson | 2 episodes |
| 1980 | Enemy at the Door | Unterwachtmeister Klaas | Series 2, episode 2: "Reception for the General" |
| 1980 | Play for Today | Doctor | Series 10, episode 15: "Murder Rap" |
| 1980 | A Question of Guilt | Vicar | Episode 1: "Constance Kent: Part 1" |
| 1980 | Time of My Life | Edward | Episode 6 |
| 1980 | The Gentle Touch | Police Doctor | Series 1, episode 4: "Shock" |
| 1980 | The Enigma Files | Charles Higgins | Episode 6: "The Charity Man" |
| 1980 | Escape | Sweet | Episode 4: "Alfred Hinds" |
| 1980 | Terry and June | Arthur | Series 2, episode 12: "Only Two Can Play" |
| 1980 | A Tale of Two Cities | Bank Clerk | 2 episodes |
| 1980 | Minder | Collin | Series 2, episode 12: "Caught in the Act, Fact" |
| 1980 | A Little Silver Trumpet | Policeman | Miniseries; 2 episodes |
| 1980 | To Serve Them All My Days | Raunce | Episode 10: "Part Ten" |
| 1981 | Sunday Night Thriller | Biologist | Episode 2: "Dark Secret: Part 2" |
| 1981 | Partners | Bill | Episode 1: "Partnership" |
| 1981 | The Jail Diary of Albie Sachs | Colonel McIntyre | TV movie |
| 1981 | BBC2 Playhouse | Teacher | Series 7, episode 16: "Days" |
| 1981 | Coming Home | Deputy Head | Episode #1.6 |
| 1981 | Yes Minister | Committee Member | Series 2, episode 7: "A Question of Loyalty" |
| 1981 | Kessler | Inspector | Miniseries; Episode 2 |
| 1982 | Nancy Astor | Maitre d'hotel | Episode 7: "Scandals" |
| 1982 | The Chinese Detective | Special Branch Man | Series 2, episode 8: "Secret State" |
| 1983 | Jemima Shore Investigates | Mr. Lewis | Episode 9: "A Promising Death" |
| 1985 | By the Sword Divided | Mr. John Downes | Series 2, episode 2: "Cruel Necessity" |
| 1985 | One by One | Arthur Carter | 3 episodes |
| 1985 | Mapp & Lucia | Milkman | Series 1, episode 5: "The Owl and the Pussycat" |
| 1985 | Drummonds | Mr. Rogers | Series 1, episode 7: "A Breath of Fresh Air" |
| 1985 | Bergerac | Bank Manager | Series 4, episode 1: "The Last Interview" |
| 1985-1986 | Howards' Way | James Sinclair | 8 episodes |
| 1986 | Masterpiece Theatre: Lord Mountbatten - The Last Viceroy | Attlee / Clement Attlee | Miniseries; 6 episodes |
| 1987 | Teresa | Driving Instructor | TV movie |
| 1988 | Wish Me Luck | Conducting Officer | Episode #1.2 |
| 1988 | Hannay | Ross | Series 1, episode 6: "The Hazard of the Die" |
| 1988-1994 | The Bill | Hugh Cardwell / Chas Baker / Mr. Covington | 3 episodes |
| 1990 | EastEnders | Carter | 1 episode |
| 1992 | Moon and Son | Mr. Thorpe | Episode 3: "G.I. Joe is Missing" |
| 1992 | Mr. Bean | The Postman | Episode 6: "Mr. Bean Rides Again" |
| 1993 | Poirot | Registrar | Series 5, episode 7: "Dead Man's Mirror" |
| 1994 | Moving Story | Aubrey Standfast | Series 1, episode 5: "Charlotte, Emma, Bamber & Anne" |
| 1995 | Joking Apart | Alison's Father | Episode #2.4 |
| 1995 | The World of Lee Evans | Station Manager | Episode 2: "Off the Rails" |
