= Al Hunter Ashton =

British actor and scriptwriter (1957–2007)

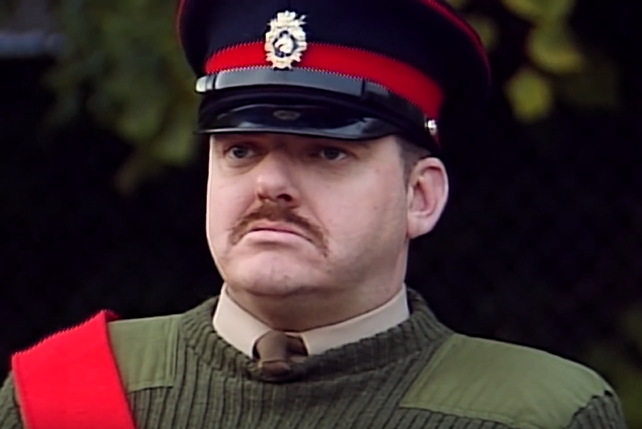
- Hunter playing an army drill instructor in "Back to School Mr. Bean" (1994)
- Born: Alan Hunter; 26 June 1957; Birmingham, Warwickshire, England
- Died: 27 April 2007 (aged 49); High Wycombe, Buckinghamshire, England
- Spouse: Sue Gibson (divorced)
- Children: 3

Al Hunter Ashton (26 June 1957 – 27 April 2007), born Alan Hunter, was a British actor and script writer.

== Life ==
Hunter was born in Birmingham, Warwickshire, and came from a working-class background. Born Alan Hunter (he later changed his name by deed poll to Al Hunter), he wrote scripts for his own amusement from the age of 15; he worked in his spare time as a stand-up comedian in clubs for £15 a night but became a stripper on discovering that he could earn the same amount for shedding his clothes every evening. "My stripping routine was actually funnier than my stand-up one," he said.

He acted under the name "Al Ashton", choosing this to ensure he appeared high up in any alphabetical credits. He wrote under the name "Al Hunter". Later he combined the two, acting and writing under the name "Al Hunter Ashton". He also wrote under the alias Alun Nipper.

== Work ==
His first professional acting work was with a Theatre in Education company in Melton Mowbray, Leicestershire, and he was subsequently cast in Willy Russell plays such as Breezeblock Park (at the Liverpool Playhouse) and Blood Brothers (at the Derby Playhouse). Russell also later commissioned him to write the BBC Schools television play Teaching Matthew (in which Hunter also had a small role as a policeman, 1985), a satire on Russell's own Educating Rita.

Hunter worked very closely with the Stage 22 School of Arts Network in the UK and upon his death, children from the school made their own version of the Queen hit Only the Good Die Young which was dedicated to him and his three young children.

=== List of acting roles (incomplete) ===
- Remembrance. John.
- Angels. Played Mike Hathaway in the long running BBC TV drama series.
- Crossroads. Soap. Played Ray Grice. 108 episodes. Central TV.
- Casualty (1987 – Series 2, Episode 12)
- The Brittas Empire. Appeared as a tanker driver in Episode 8 of Series 4.
- Jack & the Beanstalk. Pantomime. Playing Fireman Sampson in the Stage 22 production at the Towngate Theatre, Basildon – Christmas 2006.
- Jekyll. Serial drama. Played Christopher.
- London's Burning. LWT's drama series about firefighters. Played Raymond "Pitbull" Darby, the loud mouthed station bully.
- Emmerdale. Soap. Played Colin Long. 7 episodes. Yorkshire Television.
- Mr In-Between. Film. Played Fat Dave.
- Mr. Bean. Sitcom. Appeared in only Episode 11, "Back to School Mr. Bean", as an Army Drill Instructor.
- The 10th Kingdom A Sitcom. TV mini-series. As a prisoner alongside Jimmy Nail (Clayface the Goblin).
- Wire in the Blood. Darren Toynton. ITV. Dir: Robson Green

=== List of writing credits (incomplete) ===
- Alison BBC TV screenplay
- EastEnders. BBC TV soap. Regular contributor since 1987. Writer/storyliner.
- The Bill. (Series 4 episode 17 Runaround)
- Holby City. Lead core writer, storyliner, producer.
- Pieces of a Silver Lining. BBC Afternoon Theatre with Martin Jameson
- Safe. Bafta winner. Best Single Drama. see External links below
- Teaching Matthew BBC TV script writer and actor
- The Broker's Man. Creator and writer. (with Tim O'Mara).
- The Firm. Screen Two. Writer (as Al Hunter)
- Alive and Kicking. Film shown in series 3 of BBC drama anthology 'Screen One'.

== Death ==
On 27 April 2007 Al Hunter Ashton died of heart failure in his home in High Wycombe, Buckinghamshire. Episode eight of series five of New Tricks, "Mad Dogs", was dedicated to his memory.

== Awards ==
- Safe (1993), a harrowing tale of homelessness. Won the 1994 Bafta TV Award as Best Single Drama. Al Ashton, writer.

== Filmography ==
Year	Title	Role	Notes
1982	Remembrance	John	
1986	Agent on Ice	Thug	
1988	A Fish Called Wanda	Warder	
1998	Ever After	Cargomaster	
1999	Treasure Island	George Merry	
2000	Gladiator	Rome Trainer #1	
2000	The Wedding Tackle	Taxi Driver	
2001	From Hell	Stonecutter	
2001	Mr In-Between	Fat Dave	
2008	Incendiary	Male Survivor	
2008	Sisterhood	Reggie	(final film role)
