= Merry Christmas, Mr. Bean =

- Mr. Bean episode
- UK VHS release
- Episode no.: Episode 7
- Directed by: John Birkin
- Written by: Robin Driscoll; Richard Curtis; Rowan Atkinson
- Original air date: 29 December 1992
- Running time: 26:27

Guest appearances
- Owen Brenman; Matilda Ziegler; John Warner; Jonathan Stratt; C. J. Allen

Episode chronology
← Previous "Mr. Bean Rides Again"	Next → "Mr. Bean in Room 426"

"Merry Christmas, Mr. Bean" is the seventh episode of the British television series Mr. Bean, produced by Tiger Television for Thames Television. It was first broadcast as a Christmas special on ITV on Tuesday 29 December 1992 as part of ITV's Christmas schedule and was watched by 18.48 million viewers during its original transmission.

This was the last episode to be co-written by Richard Curtis and the last to be broadcast by Thames Television on behalf of the ITV network. It also marks the last appearance of Mr. Bean's girlfriend, Irma Gobb (Matilda Ziegler), in the original live-action series until reappearing on Mr. Bean: The Animated Series ten years later.

== Plot ==
=== Part One ===
On Christmas Eve, Mr. Bean visits Harrods to buy decorations. While the cashier sorts out his purchases, Bean uses a Nativity display to act out a scene with other toys; his fun is halted when the clerk brings in a toy policeman.

Bean heads to the town square and meets his girlfriend, Irma Gobb. Irma points to a ring that she wants in the window of a jewellery shop, then watches Bean go inside. Bean then volunteers to assist the conductor of a Salvation Army brass band in collecting donations; in doing so, he catches a young pickpocket and forces him to hand over all of his stolen items. Bean temporarily takes over for the conductor while he goes to try on jewellery that the pickpocket stole. Afterwards, arriving at the Christmas tree stand just as the last trees in stock are bought up, Bean decides to steal the square's tree instead.

=== Part Two ===
Back at his flat, Bean packs a Christmas cracker with multiple fuses to make a "super cracker" and hangs stockings for himself, Teddy, and a mouse. He then briefly listens to a group of young carolers sing "Away in a Manger" before shutting the door on them and going to bed.

When morning comes, Bean wakes up and reveals the contents of the stockings. He then prepares to cook a turkey, but loses his watch while stuffing it. As he tries to retrieve it, he gets the turkey stuck on his head just as Irma arrives. To remove it, Irma ties a coal scuttle to the turkey and throws it out of the window.

After dinner, Irma gives Bean a model ship kit. In turn, Bean gives Irma her present, but she is disappointed to find that it is the picture from the window display, which is what he thought she was pointing to. Bean then realises that he "forgot the main bit" and takes out a ring box, which delights Irma. When she opens the box, however, she discovers that it actually contains a hook for the picture. Irma storms out of the flat, leaving Bean puzzled and hurt. Remembering his "super cracker", he decides to pull it himself, resulting in a loud explosion.

== Cast ==
- Rowan Atkinson – Mr. Bean
- Matilda Ziegler – Irma Gobb
- C. J. Allen — Santa outside Harrods
- Owen Brenman – Harrods clerk
- John Warner — Band conductor
- Lee Barrett — Pickpocket
- Robin Driscoll — Turkey weight customer (deleted scene, uncredited)

== Production ==
Most of the location scenes, set in a market, were shot on videotape in Kingston upon Thames. Studio sequences were recorded before a live audience at Thames Television's Teddington Studios. Following its broadcast on American cable television network HBO, this episode won the 1995 CableACE award for best comedy special.

A number of elements were used as inspiration for other programmes. The "lights on a major building being accidentally switched off" gag is used by comedian Peter Kay at the end of his Live at the Top of the Tower DVD, while the turkey scene inspired a scene in an episode of Friends titled "The One with All the Thanksgivings", and later led to an adaptation for the film Bean, though it was cut out of the international release (outside North America) and reserved for a special feature section entitled "Bean Scenes Unseen". Another turkey gag was used in the Mr. Bean: The Animated Series episode "Dinner for Two".

During the nativity scene, Bean introduces a military marching band while humming "The British Grenadiers", the first two bars of which is sampled in the theme tune to Blackadder Goes Forth, another sitcom Rowan Atkinson starred in and Richard Curtis co-wrote.

== Extended scene ==
An extended scene shows Bean winning the turkey that eventually gets stuck on his head. The contest being to guess the turkey's weight, he sneaks bathroom scales to the counter; having already weighed himself, he subtracts his weight from the combined weight using a calculator. The person in charge of the contest is stunned when Bean guesses the exact weight and wins it. Bean then throws the turkey into the boot of his Mini and slams the door shut. This was not seen in the original broadcast of the episode but was included in the American broadcasts on HBO and included in some home media versions.
