= Alan Shaxon =

English magician (1933–2012)

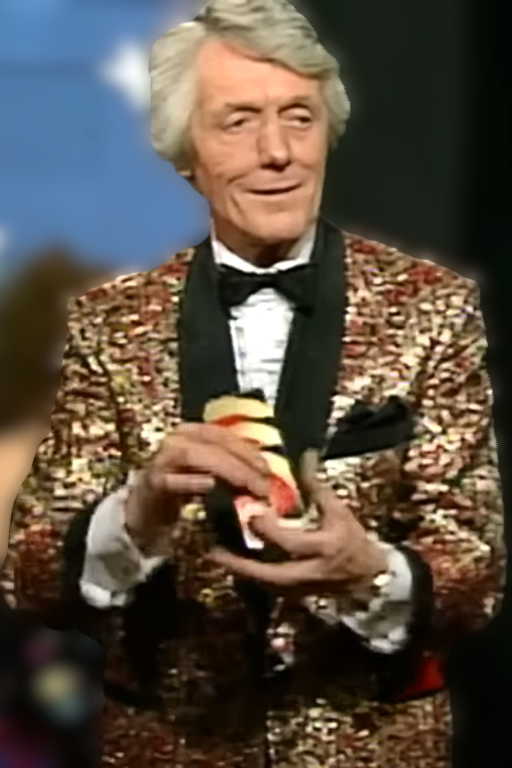
- Shaxon in "Mr. Bean Goes to Town" (1991)
- Born: Alan Arthur Howson; 28 December 1933; United Kingdom
- Died: 27 October 2012 (aged 78)
- Occupation: Magician

Alan Shaxon (28 December 1933 – 27 October 2012) was a British professional magician who was president of The Magic Circle. He specialised in cabaret performances and was billed as one of England's foremost magicians.

The Magic Circle gave Shaxon "The Maskelyne" award for services to British Magic. He appeared on television, cruised the world in cabaret on luxury liners, and entertained on four occasions at Buckingham Palace. He was a friend and confidant of magician and inventor Robert Harbin, and inherited many of Harbin's props after his death in 1978. Shaxon continued to perform a number of Harbin's illusions, including the "Blades of Opah II". Shaxon's signature effects included The Hydrostatic Glass, Confabulation, Thumb Tie, Aerial Fishing and the Human Gasometer.

Shaxon appeared as a guest performer in Series 9 of The Paul Daniels Magic Show, airing in 1988. He appeared as the character "Eddie Spangle" in the 1991 Mr. Bean episode "Mr. Bean Goes to Town", starring Rowan Atkinson. In 1996 he taught Tom Cruise sleight of hand tricks for Mission: Impossible.

He wrote two books during his lifetime, My Kind of Magic (1970) and Practical Sorcery (1976). After he died, a draft manuscript for a third book was discovered, which was completed by Scott Penrose, President of The Magic Circle, and Steve Short. It had no working title, but when it was published in 2014 it was entitled The Sophisticated Sorcerer.

Shaxon died following a short illness on 27 October 2012, at the age of 78.
