= Goodnight Mr. Bean =

- Mr. Bean episode
- A free depiction of the episode, from YouTube under the CC BY 3.0 licence.
- Episode no.: Episode 13
- Directed by: John Birkin
- Written by: Robin Driscoll; Rowan Atkinson
- Original air date: 31 October 1995
- Running time: 24:31

Guest appearances
- Elizabeth Bennett; Rupert Vansittart; Suzy Aitchison

Episode chronology
← Previous "Tee Off, Mr. Bean"	Next → "Hair by Mr. Bean of London"

"Goodnight Mr. Bean" is the thirteenth episode of the British television series Mr. Bean, produced by Tiger Aspect Productions and Thames Television for Central Independent Television. It was first broadcast as a series finale on ITV on Tuesday, 31 October 1995.

== Plot ==
=== Part One ===
Mr. Bean visits the hospital after getting his hand stuck in a teapot. He obstructs an ambulance by parking his car in front of the back doors, cheats in the queue, and rudely takes a chair from an old man. Frustrated by the long wait, Bean swaps his ticket for a lower number and tries to manipulate the digital counter, but is thwarted by another patient. After falling asleep, he loses his ticket and has to get a new one. Annoyed by his high number ticket, he throws it in the bin but gets his other hand stuck, leading him to use his mouth to retrieve another ticket.

=== Part Two ===
Bean visits Windsor Castle and takes several photographs. Upon seeing a Queen's Guard, he decorates the guard with flowers, trims his moustache, and hangs Teddy on his bayonet. Just as Bean sets the timer for a photo, the guard marches away, much to Bean's frustration.

That night, Bean struggles to fall asleep. After trying several unsuccessful methods, he begins counting sheep in a picture and, after failing several times to count them manually, uses a calculator. The sight of the number on the calculator finally puts him to sleep. After the end credits, he falls off the bed while asleep.

== Cast ==
- Rowan Atkinson as Mr. Bean
- Elizabeth Bennett as Hospital Receptionist
- Suzy Aitchison as Hospital Nurse
- Penelope Nice as the Bandaged Woman
- Rupert Vansittart as Queen's Guard

== Production ==
The opening and closing titles featured a new recording of the choral theme, performed by the Choir of Christ Church Cathedral, Oxford, which debuted in Tee Off, Mr. Bean. The first act was filmed at National Temperance Hospital in Camden, London, which had already been permanently closed since 1990 and got demolished in 2018. Studio sequences were recorded before a live audience at Teddington Studios.
