= The Curse of Mr. Bean =

- Mr. Bean episode
- Episode no.: Episode 3
- Directed by: John Howard Davies
- Written by: Richard Curtis; Robin Driscoll; Rowan Atkinson
- Original air date: 1 January 1991
- Running time: 24:31

Guest appearances
- Angus Deayton; Matilda Ziegler

Episode chronology
← Previous "The Return of Mr. Bean"	Next → "Mr. Bean Goes to Town"

"The Curse of Mr. Bean" is the third episode of the British television series Mr. Bean, produced by Tiger Television for Thames Television. It was first broadcast on ITV on 1 January 1991 and was watched by 13.81 million viewers during its original transmission. It won the 1991 International Emmy Award for Outstanding Popular Arts Programme.

== Plot ==
=== Part One ===
Mr. Bean parks his Mini in a multi-level car park and heads to a nearby swimming pool. After being admonished by a lifeguard for trying to use a children's water slide, he decides to use a diving board instead, but is overcome with fear when he realises how far above the water it actually is. Bean tries to climb off the edge, but ends up falling into the pool when a boy stomps on his fingers. The force of the fall rips off his bathing suit, which is subsequently stolen by a young girl. Left naked, Bean tries to reach the changing rooms unnoticed, but accidentally exposes himself to a women's swim team along the way.

Later, Bean finds that he must pay £16 to exit the car park. After several failed attempts to evade the fee, he notices the blue Reliant approaching the entrance. When the driver takes a ticket and the gate opens, Bean speeds towards the Reliant and forces it out of his way, allowing him to leave.

=== Part Two ===
Bean visits a park and prepares his lunch with an array of unusual tools (e.g. a credit card for spreading butter, a sock for drying lettuce, and a hot water bottle for making tea). However, just as he is about to eat, his pepper-filled handkerchief causes him to sneeze, and he drops his sandwich and sprays tea everywhere. A bystander offers Bean half of his own sandwich, which Bean accepts.

Bean then takes his girlfriend, Irma Gobb, to the cinema to see A Nightmare on Elm Street 5: The Dream Child. Before the film starts, Bean playfully scares Irma, but as the film progresses, he becomes increasingly frightened himself. To block out the film, Bean uses popcorn as makeshift earplugs and covers his eyes with the popcorn container. When the film is over, Bean, unaware that Irma has draped her coat over her shoulders, finds the sleeve empty, and the two scream.

== Cast ==
- Rowan Atkinson − Mr. Bean
- Angus Deayton – Male pool lifeguard; man on the park bench
- Matilda Ziegler – Bean's girlfriend

== Production notes ==
The swimming pool sequence was filmed at the Hayes Pool and Fitness Centre, which was demolished in 2012 with the car park sequences at the Heathrow Bowling car park and the short traffic lights scene in Twickenham at the junction of Staines Road, Hospital Bridge Road and Sixth Cross Road.

This was the last episode to be produced with OB videotape for exterior scenes utilising OB7, a two-camera unit designated for drama and light entertainment shows by Thames. Studio sequences were recorded before a live audience at Thames Television's Teddington Studios. This also marked the first appearance of Bean's 1977 Leyland Mini 1000.

The Curse of Mr. Bean won the 1991 International Emmy Award for Outstanding Popular Arts Programme.

The remastered version of the episode replaces the original black and white opening title with the standard "street" version.
