= Paul Bown =

English actor

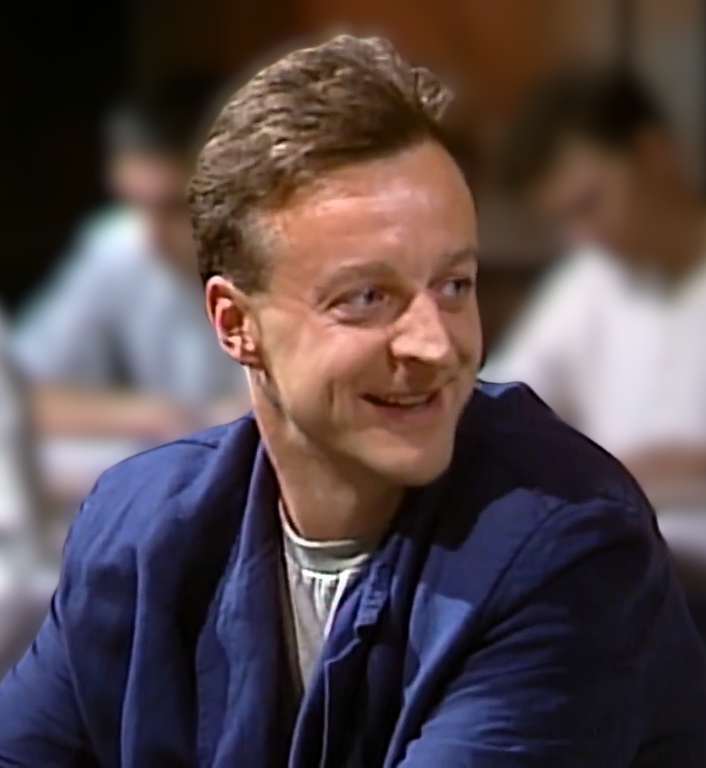
- Bown in "Mr. Bean" (1990)
- Born: 11 October 1957 (age 68); Fenton, Staffordshire, England
- Occupation: Actor
- Years active: 1980–present
- Spouse: Jane Jamieson
- Children: 4

Paul Bown (born 11 October 1957) is an English actor. Bown is best known for playing Malcolm Stoneway in the Granada Television sitcom Watching (1987–1993). He also had major roles in other comedy series, including as Roger Bones in the CBBC comedy series Pirates (1994–1997) and Harry Thorpe in the BBC comedy series The Last Salute (1998–1999).

== Acting career ==
Bown took a foundation course in art at Stoke Polytechnic before going on to do a BA degree course in Drama and Theatre Studies at Crewe and Alsager College. In 1980, Bown began his professional acting career, when he joined the Rat Theatre Company, which subsequently toured all over the UK. Later he co-founded the Optik Theatre Company with some former colleagues from his college, through the group they subsequently performed a showcase at the Cockpit Theatre in London, which helped launch his career.

In 1985, he appeared in the comedy film Morons from Outer Space as Julian Tope, one of three dim-witted aliens whose spaceship crash lands on Earth, where they subsequently become overnight celebrities. During this time, Bown also appeared in adverts for Toffee Crisp and Pizzaland. In 1987, Bown starred in his breakthrough television role as ornithologist Malcolm Stoneway in Watching, which ran for seven series and was consistently popular with audiences during its long run. In 1990, he appeared in the first episode of Mr. Bean as "The Student".

In 1993, shortly after Watching ended, he appeared as a space watcher in the Last of the Summer Wine episode "Welcome to Earth". In 1994, Bown played Russian sailor Vladmir Ivanov in Heartbeat, the first of his two appearances in the long running series. Later that year, Bown featured in Pirates, as Roger Bones, a former pirate and single father who swaps life on the seven seas for a quiet existence in the suburbs of Wordsworth Close. Bown also appeared as Uncle Jim in the film Jude (1996) with Christopher Eccleston and Kate Winslet, which was adapted from the Thomas Hardy novel Jude the Obscure.

In 1998, he starred as Harry Thorpe an AA Patrolman in the BBC comedy series The Last Salute, which ran for two series. The following year, he appeared in a pilot for a sitcom Heavy Revie, where he played the brother of a former heavy metal rock star played by Frank Skinner. A pilot was taped but the series was not picked up.

In 2001, Bown appeared as Dr Al Blake in two series of the police procedural series Merseybeat. In 2005, he made his second appearance on Heartbeat, as John Boaden. He later featured as Colin Cakeworthy in two episodes of the sitcom The Green Green Grass between 2006 and 2007. Bown also appeared, in November 2007, in acclaimed British drama Britz. In 2008, he played publican Rod Erskine in an episode of New Tricks, first broadcast on 25 August 2008. In 2009, he appeared briefly as Mike Bamber, chairman of Brighton and Hove Albion Football Club, in the Brian Clough biopic The Damned United. In the 2010 Christmas special of My Family, he played the grandfather of a young girl who Ben meets while filling in for Father Christmas.

In 2016, he appeared in the BBC television series Father Brown as Mordaunt Jackson in the episode "The Sins of the Father". In 2017, he appeared in the ITV television series Endeavour as the Rev Mervyn Golightly.

In 2019, Bown appeared in episode 4 of the ITV drama A Confession, alongside Martin Freeman and Joe Absolom; Bown played the ex-cellmate of serial killer Christopher Halliwell. Later that year he appeared in Coronation Street as the brother of Roy Cropper, while in 2020 he appeared as Michael Connors in series 2 of the ITV drama Bancroft. In 2022, he appeared in an episode of Death in Paradise as UK chess champion Maurice Holburne.

== Theatre roles ==
In 1986, Bown featured in the musical play The Gambler, alongside Mel Smith and Phil Davis, which ran at the Hampstead Theatre, before moving onto a subsequent run at the Comedy Theatre. In 1993, he appeared in Off the Piste as Chris Baxter, a womanising and obnoxious DJ, which was described at the time as a departure from his well-known role as the wimpish Malcolm; it ran at the Garrick Theatre during February–March 1993. In 2005, he appeared as Angus in Neville's Island alongside Les Dennis, which ran at The Rep, Birmingham between April and May 2005. In 2009, he appeared as Albert Parker in the J. B. Priestley play When We Are Married, which featured at the Liverpool and Everyman Playhouse and West Yorkshire Playhouse. Between 2012 and 2013, Bown featured in the stage adaption of The Ladykillers, where he played the lead role of the Fiery Angel/Professor Marcus, which toured around the UK following its initial run in the West End.

== Personal life ==
Bown is married to Jane Jamieson, and has four children.

== Filmography ==
=== Film ===
Film
Year	Title	Role	Notes
1985	Morons from Outer Space	Julian Tope	
1985	Underworld	Nygaad	
1985	The Assam Garden	Water Board man	
1995	Butterfly Kiss	Gary	
1996	Jude	Uncle Jim	
2001	Young Blades	Bassous	
2009	The Damned United	Mike Bamber	
2013	The Arbiter	2013	
2016	The Carer	Head examiner	
2017	The Hippopotamus	Roddy	Credited as Paul Brown
2018	Peterloo	Mill owner	

=== Television ===
Television
Year	Title	Role	Notes
1984	Still Life	Orderly	TV movie
1987	Up Line	Victor Technology	Miniseries
1987–1988	Screen Two	Prynne - The Journalists / Police Constable	2 episodes
1987–1993	Watching	Malcolm Stoneway	56 episodes
1990	Mr. Bean	The exam student	Episode 1: "Mr. Bean"
1991	Time Riders	Captain	Miniseries; 2 episodes
1993	Last of the Summer Wine	Space Watcher	Christmas special: "Welcome to Earth"
1994–1997	Pirates	Roger Bones	24 episodes
1994	Heartbeat	Vladimir Ivanov	Series 4, Episode 9: "Red Herring"
1997–2006	The Bill	Tony Dean	Series 13, Episode 22: "Just Looking"
1998	Peak Practice	James "Mac" Macarty	Credited as Paul Brown; Series 6, Episode 9: "Glass Houses"
1998–1999	The Last Salute	Harry Thorpe	12 episodes
2000	Badger	First investigator	Series 2, Episode 1: "Troubled Waters"
2000–2015	Casualty	Col Morrison / Ed Connors	2 episodes
2000–2017	Doctors	Christian Glover / Paul Chandley / Graeme Goodson / William Ribble / Neil Langley / Frank James	6 episodes
2001	Out of the Ashes	Ben	TV movie
2001	My Uncle Silas	Charlie White	Credited as Paul Brown; Series 1, Episode 1: "The Wedding/Queenie White"
2001–2002	Merseybeat	Dr Al Blake	18 episodes
2002–2003	Born and Bred	Don McClure	2 episodes
2003	Murder Investigation Team	Gary Sutcliffe	Credited as Paul Brown; Series 1, Episode 6: "Models and Millionaires"
2003–2011	Holby City	Julian Wells / Philip Reid / Karl Massey	3 episodes
2004	The Courtroom	George Bowes	Episode 37: "The Postman"
2005	Heartbeat	John Boaden	Series 15, Episode 8: "The Good Samaritan"
2005	Planespotting	Ralph	TV movie
2005	Diamond Geezer	Guv'nor	Episode 1: Pilot
2006	The Bill	Trevor Wright	Series 22, Episode 39: "Desperation and Jelousy"
2006–2007	The Green Green Grass	Colin Cakeworthy	2 episodes
2007	The History of Mr. Polly	Teacher	TV movie
2007	Britz	Phipps	TV movie
2008	New Tricks	Rod Erskine	Series 5, Episode 8: "Mad Dogs"
2008	Caught in a Trap	Mr Thornton	TV movie
2009	Missing	Tom Laird	Series 1, Episode 3: "Repeat Offender"
2010	Law & Order: UK	John Stirman	Series 2, Episode 5: "Survivor"
2010	My Family	Frank	Christmas special: "Mary Christmas"
2011	Gates	Mr Fielding	Episode 1: "The First Day"
2011	Rosamunde Pilcher		Episode: "In der Mitte eines Lebens"
2014	Harriet's Army	Harbourmaster	Miniseries; Episode 3: "Casualties of War"
2016	Father Brown	Mordaunt Jackson	Series 4, Episode 9: "The Sins of the Father"
2016	Hetty Feather	Collins	2 episodes
2016	Exodus: Our Journey to Europe	Narrator	3 episodes
2017	Endeavour	Rev. Mervyn Golightly	Series 4, Episode 2: "Canticle"
2017	Hollyoaks	Judge Francis Hume	3 episodes
2017–2021	999: On the Frontline	Narrator	47 episodes
2019	A Confession	Roy Sandlake	Miniseries; Episode 4
2019	Coronation Street	Richard Lucas	13 episodes
2020	Bancroft	Michael Connors	2 episodes
2020	Belgravia	Jacob Astley	Miniseries; 2 episodes
2022	Death in Paradise	Maurice Holburne	Series 11, Episode 8: "Death of a Pawn"
2022	The Walk-In	Renshaw's solicitor	Miniseries; 2 episodes
2023	Sister Boniface Mysteries	Quentin Waterford	Series 2, Episode 5: "St George's Defence"
2023	Vera	Glynn Allen	Series 12, Episode 1: "Against the Tide"
2025	Surface	Farmer	Series 2, Episode 8: "Unearthed"
2026	Run Away	Maish Iverson	Seres 1, Episode 5: "Forever, Being the Shining Truth"
