= The Return of Mr. Bean =

- Mr. Bean episode
- Episode no.: Episode 2
- Directed by: John Howard Davies
- Written by: Richard Curtis; Robin Driscoll; Rowan Atkinson
- Original air date: 5 November 1990
- Running time: 24:57

Guest appearances
- Dave O'Higgins; Paul McDowell; William Vandyck; John Junkin; Roger Lloyd-Pack; Steve McNicholas; Matilda Ziegler; Robin Driscoll

Episode chronology
← Previous "Mr. Bean"	Next → "The Curse of Mr. Bean"

"The Return of Mr. Bean" is the second episode of the British television series Mr. Bean, produced by Tiger Television for Thames Television. It was first broadcast on ITV on 5 November 1990.

This was the first episode to be co-written by regular collaborator Robin Driscoll (alongside Richard Curtis and Rowan Atkinson) and the first to feature the familiar Howard Goodall choral Latin-dubbed theme (Ecce homo qui est faba, Latin for Behold the Man, Who is a Bean) performed by the choir of Southwark Cathedral. It is the first episode to also introduce the familiar title sequence, albeit in a Black and white format.

== Plot ==
=== Act 1: The Department Store ===
On his way to an Allders department store, Mr. Bean encounters a busker (Dave O'Higgins) playing a tenor saxophone and wants to give him change, but has only a banknote on him. Having an idea, he places a handkerchief on the road nearby and performs a rather silly dance, allowing him to get some change from an elderly woman, which he quickly places in the busker's saxophone case before disappearing through the nearby tunnel.

Bean arrives at the store and takes a moment to admire his new American Express charge card. After crawling through the perfume department to avoid the overwhelming fragrances, he soon begins searching for items to buy, testing them first, with some done in unusual fashion – he removes a toothbrush from its packet to see how it feels on his teeth, wraps himself with a towel, finds a good peeler by using it on a fresh potato he brought with him and tests two frying pans for size with a fish he had inside his jacket. When looking for a new telephone, Bean finds the ones on display do not have a dialling tone and thinks they do not work, but eventually takes one from a receptionist's desk when he finds it works.

At the checkout, Bean sets his card on the counter, only for another customer to mistakenly take it after accidentally covering up his own charge card of the same kind that the cashier had returned. Bean, realising this, picks the man's pocket and swaps the cards back (instead of simply speaking with the man about the mix-up), but while returning the customer's wallet to his back pocket, he gets his hand stuck and finds himself being unwittingly pulled all the way into the men's toilets. In the cubicle, Bean finds himself trapped, with the customer not knowing he is there until he helps him to find the toilet roll; though the man initially accepts gratefully, he suddenly realises that he is not alone in the cubicle and jumps up in fright as Bean smiles nervously at him.

=== Act 2: The Restaurant ===
Bean goes to a fancy restaurant to celebrate his birthday. While making his choice and leaving the money for the food on a plate, he writes out a birthday card to himself, feigning surprise upon opening and reading it. When the maître d' returns, Bean orders what he thinks will be a regular steak, and as he waits for his food, he takes a moment to sample some of the house wine before using the glasses on his table to chime out "Happy Birthday to Me". When the waiter arrives with his meal, Bean pays him, making the waiter think he is being given a generous tip. Upon being left to eat his meal, Bean realises that he ordered a steak tartare, and becomes disgusted upon tasting it and being forced to swallow the first bite to avoid upsetting the restaurant staff. Seeking to avoid eating the rest of it, Bean cuts it up and sticks bits of the meal into an ashtray, a tiny flower vase, a hollowed-out bread roll, under a small plate, and into the base of a sugar bowl.

Shortly after this, a violinist walks towards Bean's table and, spotting his card, plays "Happy Birthday" for him, before playing another tune, holding a note until he eats another piece of steak. As soon as the violinist turns his back on him, Bean spits it down the violinist's trousers, and puts some in a distracted woman's handbag. The waiter trips over Bean's outstretched leg. Using this opportunity to cover up his actions, Bean declares that the accident caused his meal to be spread everywhere he hid it, leading the maître d' to apologise for the accident and relocate him to another table. The waiter soon brings over a new meal on the house, which, to Bean's horror, is another steak tartare.

=== Act 3: The Royal Premiere ===
The Odeon Luxe Leicester Square is preparing to host a royal premiere attended by a member of the royal family (intended to be Queen Elizabeth the Queen Mother, but simply given as "The Royal" in the credits). The staff line up in the foyer, awaiting the arrival of the royal party. Bean arrives a little late but is excited to greet the royal, and practises his bowing technique.

While standing in line between the cinema's manager (Robin Driscoll) and an usherette (Matilda Ziegler), Bean realises multiple issues with how he is presented. He polishes his shoes with saliva, uses a breath-freshener spray, and pulls a loose thread from the usherette's uniform to floss his teeth, only for the thread to get stuck between his teeth. He eventually yanks it out before briefly turning away to scream in pain. He then realises the other men all have pocket handkerchiefs in their evening suits. After unsuccessfully attempting to steal the manager's own, Bean uses the white, blank side of a postcard to create a makeshift one. Bean then uses the fly of his trousers to clean his fingernails, finishing just as the royal arrives. As she begins to greet the staff, Bean realises he forgot to zip up his flies, panicking when they become stuck. Then, when he sticks his hand down his trousers to pull them up, he leaves his finger sticking out in a rather lewd manner. Fortunately, he manages to remove his finger and zip his trousers up in time, but upon greeting the royal with his swift bow, he accidentally headbutts her and knocks her to the ground. As staff and security rush in to help her up, Bean makes a swift run for the exit as the episode ends.

== Cast ==
- Rowan Atkinson as Mr. Bean and the news reporter (off-camera)
- Dave O'Higgins as the busker
- Paul McDowell as the customer at the department store
- William Vandyck as the checkout manager
- John Junkin as the maitre d'
- Roger Lloyd-Pack as the waiter
- Steve McNicholas as the violinist
- Matilda Ziegler as the usherette
- Robin Driscoll as man in toilet and the cinema manager
- Tina Maskall as the royal

== Production ==
Most of the opening act was recorded on OB videotape at an Allders department store in Sutton, although the opening scene was filmed at an underpass in Twickenham. The rest of the episode was recorded before a live audience at Thames Television's Teddington Studios.

In 1991, it was announced 20th Century Fox had a feature film adaptation of Mr. Bean in development. They remade Act 3 into a short film: Mr. Bean Goes to a Première and attached it to their theatrical releases. It was also included on the UK VHS rental release of Hot Shots! Part Deux.

The remastered version of the episode replaces the original black and white opening title with the standard "street" version.
