= Mr. Bean (Mr. Bean episode) =

- Mr. Bean episode
- Episode no.: Episode 1
- Directed by: John Howard Davies
- Written by: Ben Elton; Richard Curtis; Rowan Atkinson
- Original air date: 1 January 1990
- Running time: 25:53

Guest appearances
- Paul Bown; Rudolph Walker; Roger Sloman; Howard Goodall; Richard Briers

Episode chronology
| ← Previous — | Next → "The Return of Mr. Bean" |

"Mr. Bean" is the pilot episode of the British television series Mr. Bean, produced by Tiger Television for Thames Television. It was first broadcast on ITV on 1 January 1990 and was watched by 13.45 million viewers during its original transmission.

The episode, written by Ben Elton, Richard Curtis and Rowan Atkinson, also featured special guest Richard Briers alongside Paul Bown, Rudolph Walker (who would later co-star with Atkinson in Ben Elton's The Thin Blue Line) and a cameo appearance by theme music composer Howard Goodall.

== Plot ==
=== Part One ===
Mr. Bean drives to a mathematics exam in his Mini, causing an accident with a blue Reliant as he does so. Upon reaching the college, Bean readies himself by taking out multiple pens, a policeman doll, a Pink Panther doll, and a Mickey Mouse alarm clock. He is alarmed to find that the exam is on calculus, having prepared for trigonometry. After failing repeatedly to copy his neighbour's answers, Bean falls asleep. Just before the exam ends, an announcement realises there were two papers in the envelope, one on calculus and one on trigonometry. Bean frantically tries to complete the trigonometry paper, continuing to write past the final warning until his alarm clock rings.

Later, Bean visits the beach and attempts to change into his swim trunks, but worries about exposing himself to a man in a nearby deckchair. Once he finally succeeds, Bean notices the man picking up a white cane and departing, causing him to realize that the man was blind the whole time.

=== Part Two ===
Bean attends a service at Stanmer Church and sits next to a man named Mr. Sprout. During the sermon, he sneezes and wipes his nose with his coat pocket. He then tries to discreetly eat a sweet, but accidentally drops it into his shirt. Bean retrieves the sweet from his clothes, but when he tries to finally eat it, Mr. Sprout's sudden glance makes him accidentally deposit it into the same pocket he used to wipe his nose.

During the end credits, Mr. Bean encounters the Reliant again, but turns down a dead-end street and crashes his Mini.

== Cast ==
- Rowan Atkinson as Mr. Bean and the vicar (off-camera)
- Paul Bown as the student
- Rudolph Walker as the invigilator
- Roger Sloman as the blind man
- Howard Goodall as the church organist
- Richard Briers as Mr. Sprout

== Production ==
Following success with his character during his introduction at the Montreal comedy festival Just for Laughs in 1987, a script was written by Ben Elton, making this the only script he wrote for the series. Thames Television commissioned the pilot in 1989. The company's head of light entertainment, John Howard Davies, personally oversaw the first three episodes of the series as its producer and director.

The pilot itself was produced during the latter part of 1989, with location scenes filmed on OB videotape around the Peacehaven and Stanmer areas of East Sussex, including Stanmer House and Stanmer Church. The interior scenes recorded before a live audience at Thames' Teddington Studios complex.

As the episode was merely a pilot, it was simply called "Mr. Bean" and did not feature opening titles, nor the choral theme tune. Instead, the episode's title was superimposed along with initial credits during the scene of Bean's journey to the exam hall, with the closing credits during the final scene. The remastered version of the episode adds the standard opening titles and removes the credits from the opening scene.

In 1991, it was announced 20th Century Fox had a feature film adaptation of Mr. Bean in development. They remade Act 1 into a short film: Mr. Bean Takes an Exam and attached it to their theatrical releases. It was also included on the UK VHS rental release of Hot Shots! Part Deux. John McGlynn portrayed the fellow student and John Savident portrayed the exam invigilator.

=== Awards and legacy ===
The pilot won the 1990 Golden Rose award, with the church sketch later performed live by both Rowan Atkinson and Angus Deayton as part of a comedy tour in 1991. The beach sketch inspired the storyline for "Ray of Sunshine" from Mr. Bean: The Animated Series.
