= John Birkin =

British director and producer

Sir John Christian William Birkin, 6th Baronet (born 2 July 1953) is a British director and producer.

== Biography ==
John Birkin is a television director and production manager, known for Mr. Bean (1990), Chef! (1993), and Victoria Wood with All the Trimmings (2000), among other television shows.

Birkin's father was the Gothic novelist Charles Birkin and his mother was the Australia-born actress Janet Johnson. He and the actress Jane Birkin both come from the lineage of the Birkin baronetcy and he is the 6th baronet. He is the cousin of Andrew Birkin, David Birkin, Jane Birkin, and Ned Birkin. He was married to Emma Gage on 25 June 1994 and they have two children.

== Filmography ==
As director

- 1987: French and Saunders (TV series)
- 1988: 1st Exposure
- 1990: Harry Enfield's Television Programme (TV series)
- 1991: The Trouble with Mr. Bean (video)
- 1992: The Merry Mishaps of Mr. Bean (video)
- 1992: The Perilous Pursuits of Mr. Bean (video)
- 1992: Tales from the Poop Deck (TV series)
- 1993: Chef! (television series)
- 1993: The Smell of Reeves and Mortimer (TV series)
- 1994: The Final Frolics of Mr. Bean (video)
- 1994: The Honeymoon's Over (TV)
- 1995: Unseen Bean (video)
- 1995: Mister Fowler ("The Thin Blue Line") (TV series)
- 1996: Never Mind the Horrocks (TV)
- 1997: The Best Bits of Mr. Bean (video)
- 1997: Dame Edna Kisses It Better (TV series)
- 1997: It's Ulrika! (TV)
- 1998: You Are Here (TV)
- 1999: Mrs. Merton and Malcolm (TV series)
- 2000: Victoria Wood with All the Trimmings (TV)
- 2000: The Creatives
- 2001: The Fitz (TV series)
- 2002: Dead Ringers (TV series)
- 2003: The Sitcom Story (TV)

As producer

- 1993 : The Smell of Reeves and Mortimer (TV series)

== See also ==
- Birkin baronets

Baronetage of the United Kingdom
| Preceded by Charles Birkin | Baronet (of Ruddington Grange); 1985–present | Incumbent |
