= Mr. Bean =

British television sitcom (1990–1995)

- Original title card from 1992 to 1996
- Genre: Sitcom
- Created by: Rowan Atkinson; Richard Curtis
- Written by: Ben Elton (Episodes 1, clip show); Richard Curtis (Episodes 1–7, clip show); Robin Driscoll (Episodes 2–14, clip show); Rowan Atkinson
- Directed by: John Howard Davies (Episodes 1–3, clip show); John Birkin (Episodes 4–7, 10–14); Paul Weiland (Episodes 8–9)
- Starring: Rowan Atkinson
- Opening theme: "Mr. Bean's Theme" (Episode 1) "Ecce homo" by the Choir of Southwark Cathedral (Episodes 2–11; 14, clip show) "Ecce Homo" by the Choir of Christ Church Cathedral (Episodes 12 and 13)
- Ending theme: "Mr. Bean's Theme (Reprise)" (Episode 1) "Vale Homo" by the Choir of Southwark Cathedral (Episodes 2–6, 8–10) "Vale Homo" by the Choir of Christ Church Cathedral (Episodes 13, clip show) "Vale Homo" (instrumental) (Episodes 7, 11, 12 and 14)
- Composer: Howard Goodall
- Country of origin: United Kingdom
- Original language: English
- No. of episodes: 14 (Plus a Clip Special) (list of episodes)

Production
- Executive producer: Peter Bennett-Jones
- Producers: John Howard Davies (Episodes 1–; Sue Vertue (Episodes 4–9, 12 – clip show); Peter Bennett-Jones (Episodes 10–11, clip show)
- Camera setup: Multi-camera setup (Ep. 1–7, 9, 11–14, clip show); Single-camera setup (Ep. 8, 10)
- Running time: 24–26 minutes
- Production company: Tiger Aspect Productions (Note: In association with Thames Television until 1993 and in association with Central Independent Television until 1995.)

Original release
- Network: ITV
- Release: 1 January 1990 – 15 November 1995

Related
- Bean; Mr. Bean: The Animated Series; Mr. Bean's Holiday

Mr. Bean is a British sitcom created by Rowan Atkinson and Richard Curtis, produced by Tiger Aspect Productions and starring Atkinson as the title character. The sitcom consists of 14 episodes that were co-written by Atkinson alongside Curtis and Robin Driscoll; the pilot episode was co-written by Ben Elton. The series originally aired on ITV, beginning with the pilot episode on 1 January 1990 and ending with "Goodnight Mr. Bean" on 31 October 1995, but it concludes both on VHS with "Hair by Mr. Bean of London" on 15 November 1995 and a clip special, "The Best Bits of Mr. Bean" on 21 October 1996.

Based on a character developed by Atkinson while he was studying for his master's degree at the University of Oxford, the series centres on Mr. Bean, described by Atkinson as "a child in a grown man's body", as he solves various problems presented by everyday tasks and often causes disruption in the process. The series has been influenced by physical comedy actors such as Jacques Tati and those from early silent films.

During its original five-year run, Mr. Bean was met with widespread acclaim and attracted large television audiences. The series was viewed by 18.74 million viewers for the episode "The Trouble with Mr. Bean" and has received a number of international awards, including the Rose d'Or. The series has since been sold in 245 territories worldwide. It has inspired an animated spin-off and two theatrical feature-length films, along with Atkinson reprising the titular role for a performance at the 2012 Summer Olympics opening ceremony in London, television commercials, and several sketches for Comic Relief. The programme carries strong appeal in hundreds of territories worldwide because, in addition to the acclaim from its original run, it uses very little intelligible dialogue, making it accessible to people who know little or no English.

== Origin ==
The character of Mr. Bean was developed while Rowan Atkinson was studying for his master's degree in electrical engineering at The Queen's College, Oxford. A sketch featuring Bean was performed at the Edinburgh Fringe in the early 1980s. Robert Box, a similar character also played by Atkinson, appears in the one-off 1979 ITV sitcom Canned Laughter which also features routines used in the motion picture in 1997.

One of Bean's earliest appearances occurred at the "Just for Laughs" comedy festival in Montreal, Quebec, Canada, in 1987. When programme coordinators were scheduling him into the festival programme, Atkinson insisted that he perform on the French-speaking bill rather than the English-speaking programme. Having no French dialogue in his act at all, programme coordinators could not understand why Atkinson wanted to perform on the French bill instead. As it turned out, Atkinson's act at the festival was a test platform for his character and he wanted to see how his character's physical comedy would fare on an international stage with a non-English speaking audience.

The character's name was not decided until after the first episode had been produced; a number of other vegetable-influenced names such as "Mr. Cauliflower" were explored. Atkinson cited the earlier comedy character Monsieur Hulot, created by French comedian and director Jacques Tati, as an influence on the character. Atkinson also cited the influence of Peter Sellers, who had previously played similar "fumbling fool" characters, notably Hrundi Bakshi in The Party (1968) and Inspector Clouseau in The Pink Panther films. Stylistically, Mr. Bean is also similar to early silent films, relying purely upon physical comedy with Mr. Bean speaking very little dialogue (although like other live-action sitcoms during this period, it featured a laugh track). This has allowed the series to be sold worldwide without any significant changes to dialogue. In November 2012, Atkinson told The Daily Telegraph of his intentions to retire the character, stating that "someone in their fifties being childlike becomes a little sad". In 2016, however, Atkinson changed his mind by saying that he would never retire playing Mr. Bean.

== Characters and recurring props ==
=== Mr. Bean ===
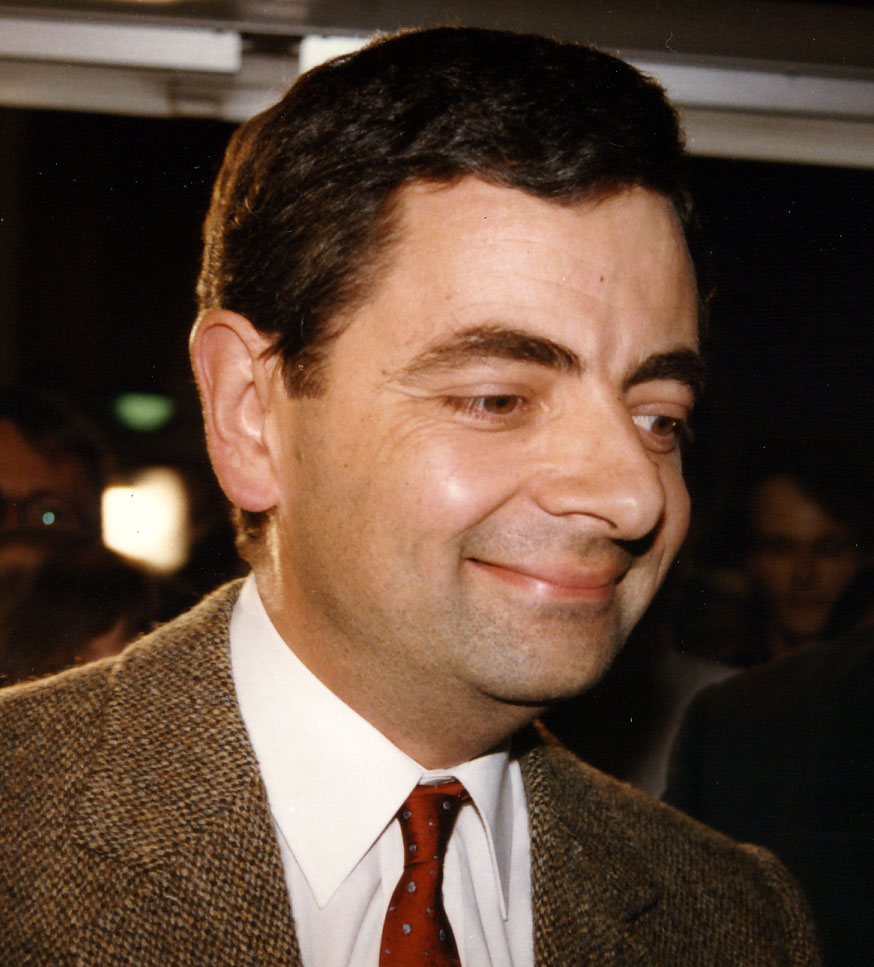
Rowan Atkinson portraying Mr. Bean in August 1997

Mr. Bean, the title character and protagonist, is a childish buffoon who brings various unusual schemes and contrivances to everyday tasks. He lives alone at the address of Flat 2, 12 Arbour Road, Highbury, and is almost always seen in his trademark tweed jacket and a skinny red tie. He also usually wears a digital calculator watch. Mr. Bean rarely speaks, and when he does, it is generally only a few mumbled words which are in a comically low-pitched voice. His first name (he names himself "Bean" to others) and profession, if any, are never mentioned. In the first film adaptation, "Mr." appears on his passport in the "first name" field and he is shown employed as a guard at London's National Gallery.

Mr. Bean often seems unaware of basic aspects of the way the world works, and the programme usually features his attempts at what would normally be considered simple activities, such as going swimming, using a television set, interior decorating or going to church. The humour largely comes from his original (and often absurd) solutions to problems and his total disregard for others when solving them, and his pettiness and occasional malevolence.

In the title sequence of episode two, Mr. Bean falls from the sky in a beam of light accompanied by a choir singing Ecce homo qui est faba ("Behold the man who is a bean") which was sung by the Southwark Cathedral choir in 1990. The opening sequence was initially in black and white in episodes two and three, which was intended by the producers to show his status as an "ordinary man cast into the spotlight". However, later episodes showed Mr. Bean dropping from the night sky in a deserted London street against the backdrop of St. Paul's Cathedral. At the end of episodes three and six, he is also shown being sucked right back up into the sky in the respective background scenes (the black scene in episode 3 and street scene in episode 6). Regarding the opening credits, Atkinson has acknowledged that Bean "has a slightly alien aspect to him". In the Mr. Bean: The Animated Series episode "Double Trouble", the alien aspect of him was used in a storyline in which he is taken inside a spacecraft with aliens who look exactly like him and even have their own plushy toys. In an obvious homage towards the end, the aliens send him back home in a beam of light and music similar to the opening of the original Mr. Bean series. Whether Bean is an extraterrestrial is not made clear.

=== Irma Gobb ===
Mr. Bean's long-suffering girlfriend, Irma Gobb (played by Matilda Ziegler), appears in three episodes. In "The Curse of Mr. Bean" and "Mr. Bean Goes to Town", the character is simply credited as "the girlfriend". She is treated relatively inconsiderately by Bean, who appears to regard her more as a friend and companion rather than as a love interest. However, he does become jealous when she dances with another man at a disco in "Mr. Bean Goes to Town", and she certainly expects him to propose to her on Christmas Day in "Merry Christmas, Mr. Bean"; his failure to do so results in her leaving him for good. Despite this, she later reappears in Mr. Bean: The Animated Series. It is revealed in the book Mr. Bean's Diary that her name is Irma Gobb and she works as a librarian at the local library.

In the Comic Relief sketch "Torvill & Bean", Bean is accompanied by a female companion portrayed by Sophie Thompson whose overall appearance resembles Gobb's.

=== Teddy ===
Teddy is Mr. Bean's teddy bear and, apparently, best friend. This little brown bear is a knitted oddity with button eyes and sausage-shaped limbs which invariably end up broken in half or in various other states of destruction and disfiguration. Although Teddy is inanimate, Mr. Bean often pretends it is alive: he always buys it a Christmas present or tries not to wake it up in the morning. For example, when Mr. Bean hypnotises Teddy, he snaps his fingers and the bear's head falls backwards as if it had fallen asleep instantly. (Bean used his finger to prop Teddy's head up.) Teddy is often privy to Mr. Bean's various schemes and doubles as a tool or other items in emergencies; it has been decapitated ("Mr. Bean in Room 426"), used as his paint brush ("Do-It-Yourself Mr. Bean") and shrunk in the wash ("Tee Off, Mr. Bean"). Teddy is also Mr. Bean's "pet" in "Hair by Mr. Bean of London" where he is used to win a pet show.

Over the years, Teddy has undergone several changes. When it debuted on "The Trouble with Mr. Bean", it had a smaller head. Two episodes later, its head reached its current size but its "eyes" were not present until Bean placed gold thumb tacks on its face. The "eyes" have since been replaced with two small white buttons sewn over Teddy's face, giving it a distinctive image.

After filming ended, Teddy was donated by Atkinson to Gyles Brandreth's teddy bear museum in Stratford-upon-Avon. In 2008 upon the museum's closing, Teddy was sold at auction for £180.

=== The Mini ===
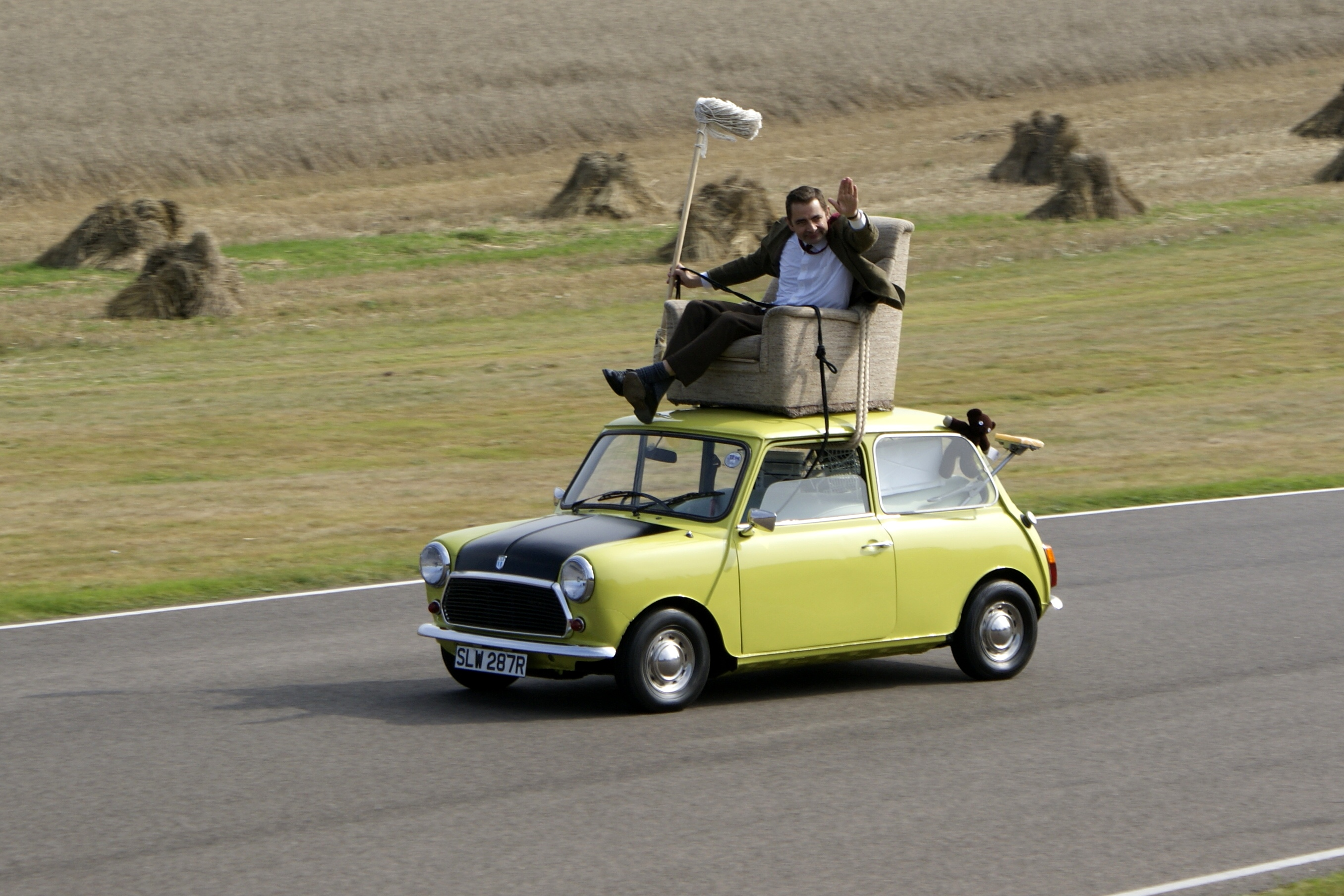
Rowan Atkinson re-enacting a famous scene from the episode "Do-It-Yourself Mr. Bean" on a Mini at Goodwood Circuit Revival 2009

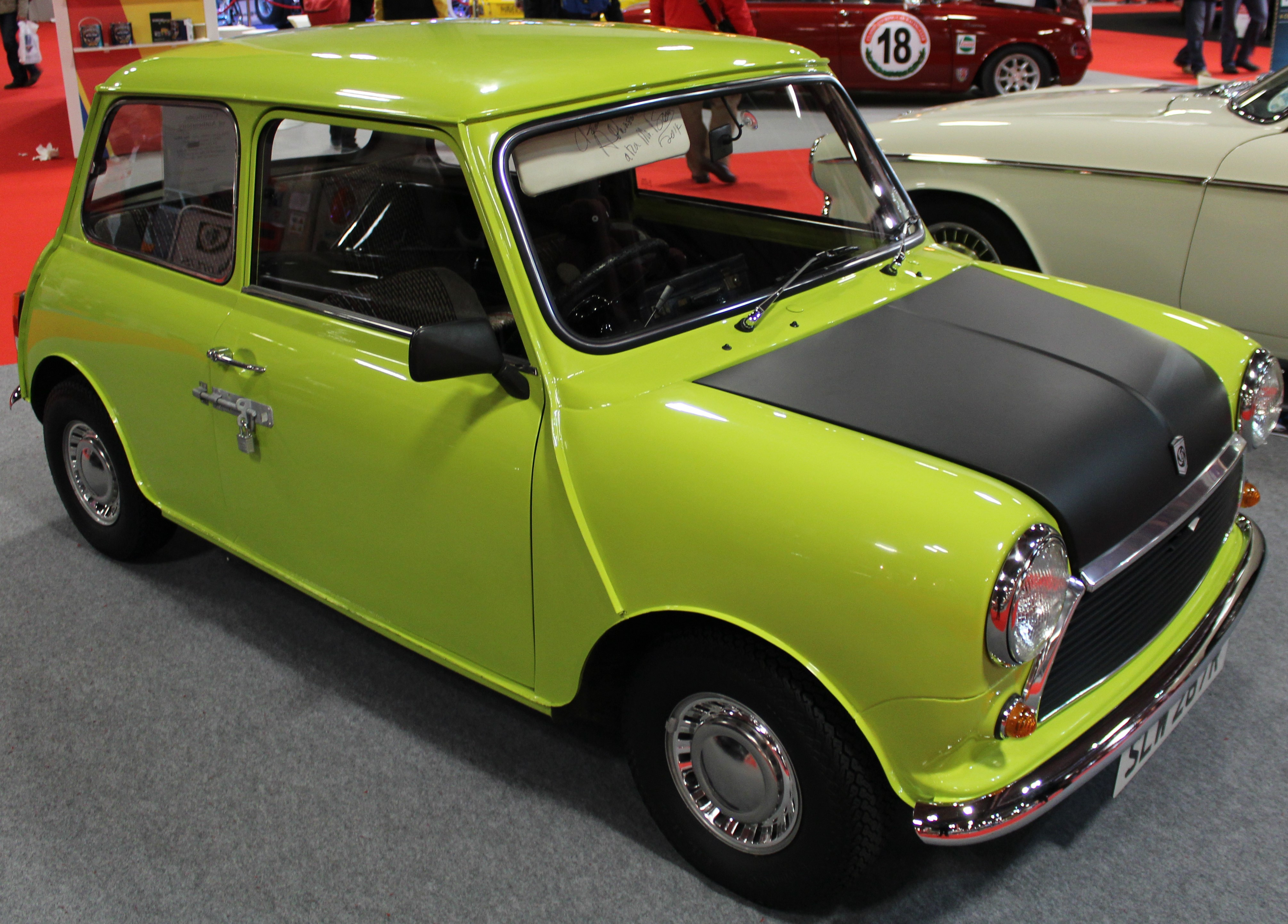
Mr. Bean's Mini

Mr. Bean's vehicle, a citron-green 1977 British Leyland Mini 1000 Mark 4 with a matte black bonnet, was central to several antics such as Bean getting dressed in it, driving while sitting in an armchair strapped to the roof or attempting to avoid a car park fee by driving out through the entrance. In the pilot episode, Bean's vehicle was an orange 1969 BMC Morris Mini 1000 Mark 2 (registration RNT 996H) but was destroyed in an off-screen crash at the end. Throughout the sitcom, Bean keeps it locked with a bolt-latch and padlock rather than the lock fitted to the car, which formed a running gag in several episodes; in two episodes, he demonstrated an additional and innovative security measure in that he removes the steering wheel instead of the key which in one episode deterred a car thief. In "Back to School Mr. Bean", Bean's Mini is crushed by a tank as part of a demonstration after he replaced an identical Mini (registration ACW 497V) meant for the demonstration with his own to secure a parking space. After losing it, he removes his padlock and bolt-latch from the remains. Although the Mini has been crushed, it nonetheless reappears in subsequent episodes with the same colours and registration number (SLW 287R) as the car that has been crushed.

There were three Minis painted green and black used in the series, as well as two others painted with the same colour scheme but with no engine that got crushed by the tank. One of the main cars was also crushed by the tank. During filming many parts were swapped from car to car throughout production, including bonnets, wheel trims, grilles, steering wheels, rear lights, occasionally the driver's door, and the seat covers.

After filming ended, one of the original Minis was sold to Kariker Kars to be hired for various events whereupon it was temporarily displayed as a major attraction at the Rover Group's museum. In 1997, it was purchased by the Cars of the Stars Motor Museum and displayed for a number of years, later being sold on to a museum in the United States. The main Mini is privately owned and nearing the end of restoration in the south of England.

To promote Mr. Bean: The Animated Series, a replica of the Mini with the registration number DRW 221T was used. This Mini is display on the website of the National Motor Museum, Beaulieu as part of its online collection. The London Motor Museum also has a replica on display.

The Mini was going to appear in the first film adaptation of the series under the registration C607 EUW. In the film, Mr. Bean drives his Mini through Harrods in order to avoid a traffic jam. Although the sequence was filmed, it was not included in the final cut. In June 2018, the Mini from the first film was sold for US$70,000. The Mini had its debut on the big screen in the film Mr. Bean's Holiday under the registration YGL 572T. Unlike the previous Minis (which were Austin Citron green), it is 'Nissan Amarillo Yellow'. The film also features a second version of the Mini with the same colour scheme but with left-hand drive, driven by Bean's friend Sabine, and registered 207 UHD 75.

The Mini reappeared in Mr. Bean: The Animated Series under the registration STE 952R. In 2015, Mr. Bean returned in a sketch for Comic Relief in which he drives his Mini to attend a funeral. This Mini bore the same registration as the one in the animated spin-off.

=== The Reliant ===
Since the pilot episode, Mr. Bean has had a long-running feud with the unseen driver of a three-wheeled, light-blue 1972 Reliant Regal Supervan III (registration GRA 26K), which would usually get turned over, crashed out of its parking space and so forth by Bean in his Mini, who is usually oblivious to the results. These mishaps also became a running gag throughout the series. In "Tee Off, Mr. Bean", Bean is hitchhiking and the Reliant pulls over for him but Bean, who recognises the car, pretends to not see it until it leaves.

The Reliant reappears in Mr. Bean: The Animated Series under the registration "DUW 742", again victimised by Mr. Bean in his Mini. In the episode "Young Bean", the identity of the Reliant driver is revealed for the first time. In the episode "Car Wars", after being abused by Mr. Bean for many years, the driver becomes angry and fed up, and decides to get his revenge by chasing Mr. Bean and trying to outmanoeuvre him in various situations, ultimately resulting in Mr. Bean's Mini being crushed by a car crusher.

=== Other characters ===
Although Mr. Bean is the only significant character in the programme, others appear usually as foils for his various antics. Other than his girlfriend Irma Gobb (Matilda Ziegler), there are more characters in each episode. However several notable British actors and comedians appear alongside Atkinson in the series as various one-off supporting characters, including Owen Brenman, Richard Briers, Roger Sloman, Angus Deayton, Stephen Frost, Nick Hancock, Christopher Ryan, Paul Bown, Caroline Quentin, Danny La Rue, Roger Brierley, Roger Lloyd-Pack, Rupert Vansittart, David Battley, David Schneider, Richard Wilson and Rudolph Walker. Vansittart and Walker later appeared alongside Atkinson in The Thin Blue Line.

== Episodes ==
All 14 episodes of Mr. Bean were produced by Tiger Aspect Productions. Additionally, the character has been used in one-off sketches, guest appearances and television commercials.

The fourteenth episode, "Hair by Mr. Bean of London", was originally released as a direct-to-video VHS exclusive in 1995, and was not broadcast on television until 25 August 2006 on Nickelodeon.

The clip show special, "The Best Bits of Mr. Bean", was originally released as a direct-to-video VHS exclusive in 1996.

== Broadcast ==
Mr. Bean originally aired in the United Kingdom on ITV from 1990 to 1995, with reruns later shown on the British variant of Comedy Central, ITV3 and ITV4. Due to its widespread popularity, the series aired in many other countries; in the United States, it aired on HBO starting on 2 April 1992, and also ran on PBS television stations across the United States. Reruns of the series were also shown on Fox Family during the late 1990s, both as segments in the variety series Ohh Nooo! Mr. Bill Presents and as stand-alone episodes.

== Music ==
Mr. Bean features a choral theme tune in the key of C major written by Howard Goodall (adapted from a passage of "Locus iste" by Anton Bruckner) and performed by the Choir of Southwark Cathedral (episodes 2–11 and 14; opening of a clip special) and Christ Church Cathedral, Oxford (episodes 12 and 13; closing of a clip special). The words sung during the title sequences are in Latin:

- "Ecce homo qui est faba" – "Behold the man who is a bean" (sung at beginning)
- "Finis partis primae" – "End of part one" (sung before the commercial break)
- "Pars secunda" – "Part two" (sung after the commercial break and rarely)
- "Vale homo qui est faba" – "Farewell, the man who is a bean" (sung at end)

The theme was later released on Goodall's album Choral Works. Goodall also wrote an accompanying music track for many episodes. The first episode of Mr. Bean did not feature the choral theme tune, but instead an up-beat instrumental piece also composed by Goodall, which was more an incidental tune than a theme. It was used while Bean drove between locations intimidating the blue Reliant, and as such, was sometimes heard in later episodes whenever Bean's nemesis is seen. The instrumental of the theme tune was used in "Double Trouble", the original series finale of Mr. Bean: The Animated Series.

In the episode "Tee Off, Mr. Bean", Goodall's choral theme tune for another Richard Curtis comedy, The Vicar of Dibley, is heard playing on a car stereo. In "Merry Christmas, Mr. Bean", while playing with Queen's Royal Guards figurines and the nativity set, he hums "The British Grenadiers", which was quoted in the theme to Blackadder Goes Forth.

Mr. Bean appeared in the music video of a 1991 fundraising single for Comic Relief, fronted by Hale and Pace, entitled "The Stonk". Mr. Bean also appeared in the music video for the Boyzone single "Picture of You", which was the main theme song for the first film adaptation.

Mr. Bean also made a Comic Relief record in 1992, entitled "(I Want To Be) Elected" and which was credited to "Mr. Bean and Smear Campaign featuring Bruce Dickinson". It was a cover of the Alice Cooper song "Elected". It reached number 9 in the UK singles chart.

== Awards ==
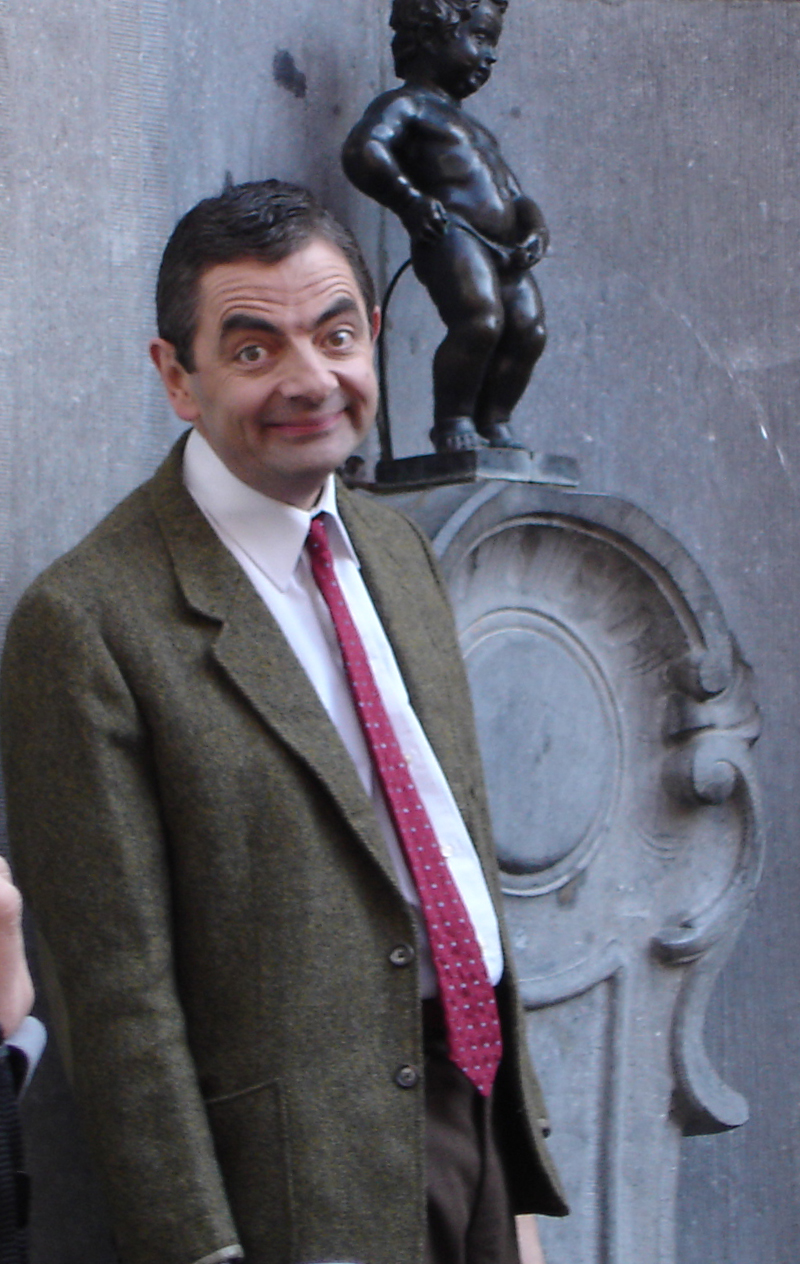
Rowan Atkinson as Mr. Bean next to Brussels' Manneken Pis in 2007

The first episode won the Golden Rose, as well as two other major prizes at the 1991 Rose d'Or Light Entertainment Festival in Montreux. In the UK, the episode "The Curse of Mr. Bean" was nominated for a number of BAFTA awards; "Best Light Entertainment Programme" in 1991, "Best Comedy" (Programme or Series) in 1991, and Atkinson was nominated three times for "Best Light Entertainment Performance" in 1991, 1992 and 1994.

== In other media ==
=== Mr. Bean: The Animated Series ===
Seven years following the end of the original live-action series, Mr. Bean reappeared in an animated television series with Rowan Atkinson reprising his role as the title character as well as providing references for all of Bean's animated actions. Much like the original live-action series, the animated spin-off contains little dialogue; although some words are spoken most is either little soundbites or mumbling. The series introduced a list of new characters alongside regulars in the original series (such as Teddy and Irma Gobb), including an unpleasant landlady of Mr. Bean named Mrs. Wicket and her evil one-eyed cat Scrapper. Other characters' voices are provided by Jon Glover, Rupert Degas, Gary Martin and Lorelei King.

From 2002 to 2004, 52 episodes were originally broadcast on ITV1 each consisting of two 11-minute segments. In 2015, CITV commissioned a brand new series of episodes. The new series amended the format in which it featured episodes that had much more dialogue than normal. 78 new episodes began broadcasting from 16 February 2015 to 8 October 2019.

In 4 January 2024, Atkinson announced that the animated sitcom would continue for the fourth series in honour of the 35th anniversary of the first episode of the original live-action series. This series contained 52 new episodes aired from 1 May 2025 to 18 September 2026 on ITVX.

=== Feature films ===
Two theatrical feature-length films featuring Mr. Bean have been released, with Atkinson reprising his role as the character in each. The first film, Bean, was directed by Mel Smith, released in 1997 and followed the misadventures of Mr. Bean as he oversaw the transfer of Whistler's Mother to a Los Angeles art gallery. The film broke from the programme's traditional narrative by using a subplot with more developed characters, whereby Bean was not the sole centre of attention but interacted with a suburban Californian family that he stays with during the film. The film was commercially successful, grossing more than US$250 million globally ($45 million in the USA) on a budget estimated at $18 million, despite receiving mixed reviews from critics and holding a 41% approval rating on Rotten Tomatoes.

The second film, Mr. Bean's Holiday, was directed by Steve Bendelack and released in 2007. The film follows Bean on an eventful journey across France for a holiday in the French Riviera which, after a number of mishaps, culminates in an unscheduled screening of his video diary at the 2006 Cannes Film Festival. The setting was despite an earlier rumour in February 2001 stating that an unused script by Richard Curtis would see him on an Australian misadventure. Production on the film occurred during 2006 and saw its first release in the United Kingdom on 30 March 2007; it premiered in North America on 17 July that year at the Just for Laughs festival in Canada, where the character had been launched 20 years earlier, before being released nationwide over a month later on 24 August. The film is notable for featuring a mixture of traditional film photography and home-shot video camera photography. The film garnered improved critical reception (with a 52% rating on Rotten Tomatoes) and was also commercially successful, grossing nearly US$230 million globally ($33 million in the United States) against a $25 million budget. Mr. Bean's Holiday was intended to be the last live-action appearance of the character, but he returned for the 2012 London Olympics opening ceremony five years later.

=== 2012 Summer Olympics opening ceremony ===
In 2012, Atkinson reprised his role as Mr. Bean for a live performance as part of the 2012 Summer Olympics opening ceremony in London. In the scene, Mr. Bean works within the London Symphony Orchestra in its performance of "Chariots of Fire", conducted by Simon Rattle. For this scene, Bean does not wear his usual brown tweed sports jacket but the traditional clothing of the musician – white tie and tails. As they perform the piece, Bean is mostly bored with playing the same note repeatedly on the synthesiser and gets jealous of the more interesting part being played on the grand piano. Still bored, he takes out his mobile phone and takes a picture of himself, looking proud. He then sneezes in a comical fashion and tries to retrieve his handkerchief from his bag behind him, finding he cannot reach it while at the synthesizer until he uses an umbrella to maintain his performance. When he finally blows his nose with his serviette, he throws it into the grand piano.

He then falls asleep continuing to play the note. A dream sequence referencing the opening scene of the film Chariots of Fire (1981) shows the characters running across a beach, though Mr. Bean dreams he is running with them. He begins to fall behind, until he hails a car to overtake all the others. Now running in front, Bean ensures he wins the race on the beach by tripping one of the runners trying to overtake him, whereupon he crosses the line with elation, and then wakes up. Finding that the rest of the orchestra have stopped playing while he continued his one recurring note, Bean, with encouragement from Rattle, plays an extended flourish and lastly touches a note that makes a flatulent sound then stops.

Director Danny Boyle later explained Atkinson's character in the performance: "It wasn't actually Mr. Bean. Strictly speaking, the name of his character was Derek" In the 2021 documentary Happy Birthday Mr. Bean, Atkinson and Curtis also stated that the performance was not actually intended to be that of Mr. Bean, although the official Olympic YouTube channel and the live commentary promoted it as such.

=== Books ===
Two books tied-in to the original live-action series were released: Mr. Bean's Diary in 1992 and Mr. Bean's Pocket Diary in 1994. The two books have identical content and differ only in the format in which they are printed. The content of both is a template diary with handwritten content scrawled in by Mr. Bean. They provide some additional information on the setting: for example, they establish that Mr. Bean lives in Highbury and rents his flat from a landlady named Mrs. Wicket.

They confirm the name of Mr. Bean's girlfriend as "Irma Gobb" and also give the name of the other man she actually dances with in "Mr. Bean Goes to Town" (Giles Gummer). An additional book also called Mr. Bean's Diary was released in 2002 to accompany Mr. Bean: The Animated Series; this book was also graded as a children's reader.

Two further books, Mr. Bean's Scrapbook: All About Me in America (1997) and Mr. Bean's Definitive and Extremely Marvelous Guide to France (2007), were released to tie-in with the feature films Bean and Mr. Bean's Holiday respectively.

=== Other appearances ===
Rowan Atkinson has appeared in character as Mr. Bean in many television broadcasts, sometimes as a publicity stunt to promote a new episode, DVD or film. A number of short sketches for the Comic Relief telethon have also been produced and Bean also starred in various commercials, music videos and in YouTube videos such as Handy Bean. In 2017 Atkinson appeared in the Chinese film Top Funny Comedian: The Movie a spin-off film of a variety show of the same name; the plot involves a number of Chinese people getting involved in a series of misadventures during a visit to Macau at the same time as Mr. Bean. One of the film's stars, comedian Guo Degang, informed media outlet The Beijinger that due to Atkinson being unable to speak Mandarin, the cast used mainly body language to speak to each other, saying that "with facial expressions and gestures we seemed to understand each other, [it] was really an interesting experience, which proves that comedy can cross boundaries." The film was distributed in Chinese territories, but as of 2017, had yet to receive an American or European release.

In October 2026, Atkinson announced Mr. Bean would feature among the characters in his upcoming 2027 stage show Rowan Live.

== Home media ==
The series was available on a number of Thames Television VHS compilations. In the United Kingdom (Region 2), episodes of Mr. Bean were released on a yearly basis by Universal Pictures UK from 2004. The complete collection is now available, including the two feature films and other extras. The episodes were released on VHS by A&E Home Video in the United States in the 2000s. These releases are unique in that they contain the original opening credits for the first three episodes, as seen when originally broadcast on television. In addition, they contain extra scenes which were edited into certain episodes at the request of PBS, in order to extend the run-time for a commercial-free airing. In Canada and the United States, Mr. Bean was released on VHS by Polygram Home Video in the 1990s. In the United States (Region 1), the complete series has been available since 2003 on A&E Home Video as "The Whole Bean". The documentary The Story of Mr. Bean is edited on both the UK and USA DVD sets: it was originally 52 minutes when broadcast on television. However, it is 48 minutes on the UK DVD while only 40 on the American DVD. Most notably, in the UK version, the section detailing The Tall Guy has humorous clips from the film removed. The American DVD features the same edits as the British DVD but is also missing comments by Burt Reynolds on the set of Bean, comments by Jeff Goldblum, some clips from the show Mr. Bean and many others. The record-selling UK videos were withdrawn shortly before the release of Bean, and the DVDs were released on an annual basis since 2004.

In August 2009, an official YouTube channel of the series was launched featuring content from both the original live-action and animated series.

The series was re-released by Shout Factory in North America on 24 March 2015 on DVD to coincide with its 25th anniversary. This set contains digitally remastered episodes (similar to the 2010 British release), the 40-minute The Story of Mr. Bean, additional scenes: "Turkey Weight", "Armchair Sale", "Marching", and "Playing with Matches", "Bus Stop" and "Library" sketches, a trailer for Mr. Bean: The Animated Series and "The Best Bits of Mr. Bean", a 72-minute clip show.

== In popular culture ==
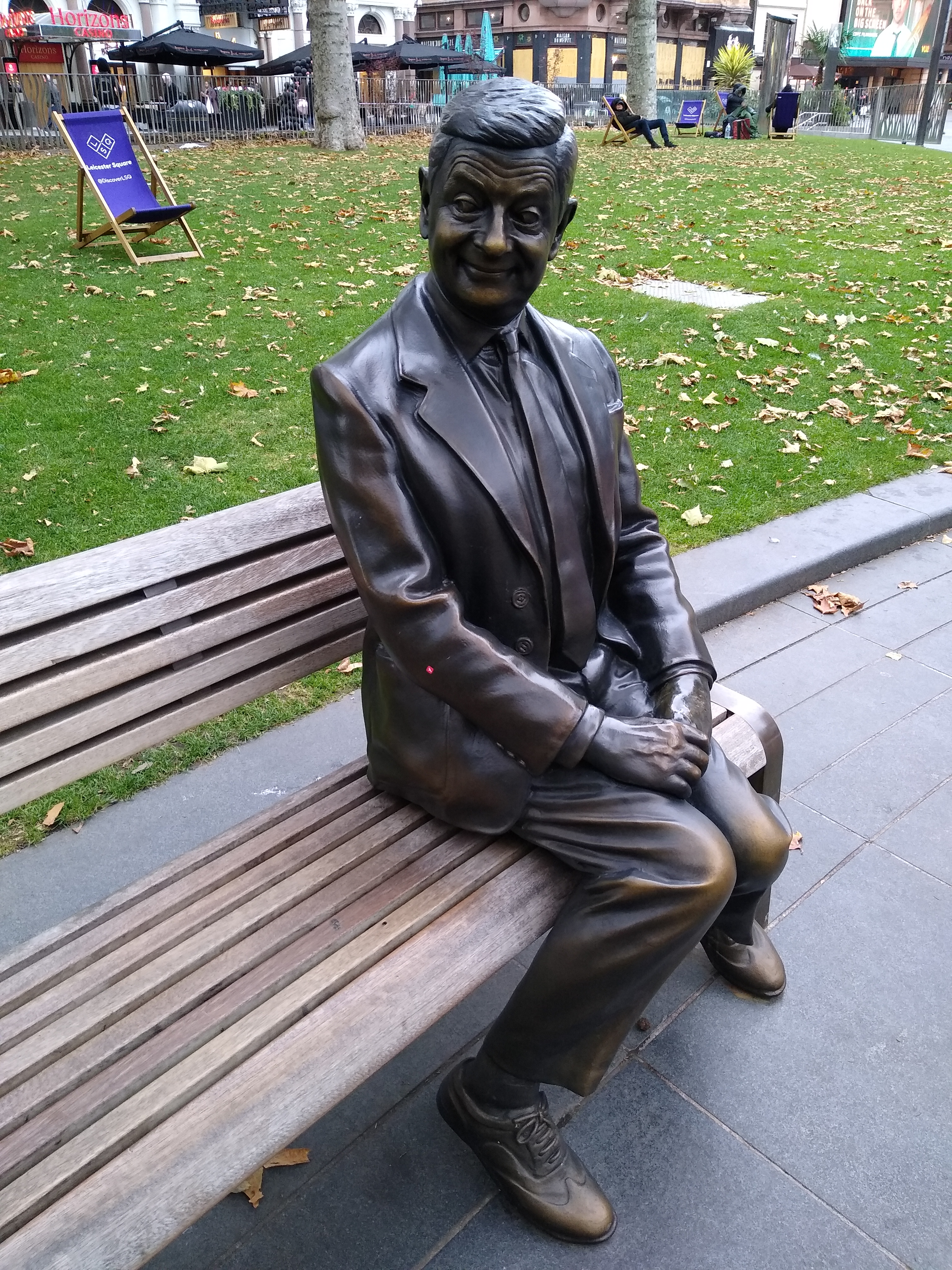
Statue of Mr. Bean in Leicester Square, London

Various politicians have been mocked for a supposed facial resemblance to Mr. Bean, including British prime ministers Tony Blair and Gordon Brown, Greek prime minister Kyriakos Mitsotakis, Spanish prime minister José Luis Rodríguez Zapatero, Australian senator Sam Dastyari, and British politicians Ed Miliband and Michael Gove. On one episode of The Graham Norton Show, Rowan Atkinson revealed that he himself is occasionally told he resembles Mr. Bean by members of the public unaware that he is the actual actor who portrays him.

In the TV series MythBusters (Episode 52 – "Mind Control"), the idea of painting a room with explosives placed in a tin of paint, as seen in "Do-It-Yourself Mr. Bean", was tested. The method was deemed impossible to achieve adequate coverage.

== See also ==
- Brian O'Brian – 2008 Italian-American TV series
- List of films based on British television series § Comedy
- The Party – 1968 American comedy film by Blake Edwards
- Uncle Max – British children's television series
