= Mr. Bean (character) =

Character in British comedy TV programme

- Mr. Bean character
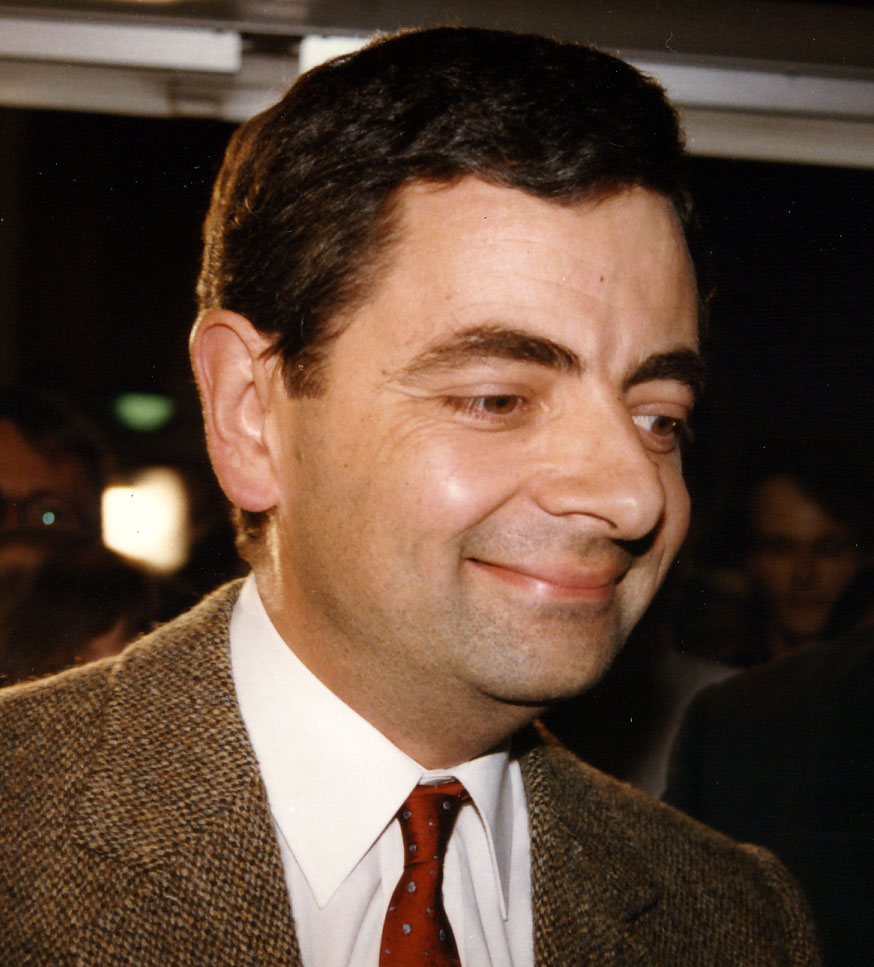
- Rowan Atkinson portraying Mr. Bean in 1997
- First appearance: "Mr. Bean" (1990)
- Created by: Rowan Atkinson, Richard Curtis
- Portrayed by: Rowan Atkinson
- Born: 15 September 1956 (age 70)

In-universe information
- Significant others: Irma Gobb; Sabine (Mr. Bean's Holiday)
- Home: Flat 2, 12 Arbour Road, Highbury, London, UK
- Nationality: British

Mr. Bean is a fictional character from the British comedy television programme Mr. Bean, its animated continuation, and two live-action feature films. He was created by Rowan Atkinson and Richard Curtis, portrayed by Atkinson, and made his first appearance on television in the pilot episode, which first aired on 1 January 1990.

== Overview ==
Mr. Bean lives in Flat 2, 12 Arbour Road, Highbury, London, England. His first name and his profession, if any, are never mentioned; he introduces himself simply as "Bean." In the first film adaptation, Bean, "Mr." appears on his passport in the "first name" field, and he is shown employed as a security guard at London's National Gallery. His date of birth is given variously as 15 September 1956, or as 6 January 1955 (the latter being Rowan Atkinson's actual date of birth).

At the beginning of episode two onwards, Mr. Bean falls from the sky in a beam of light, accompanied by a choir singing Ecce homo qui est faba ("Behold the man who is a bean"), recorded by Southwark Cathedral Choir. These opening sequences were initially in black and white in episodes two and three, and were intended by the producers to show his status as an "ordinary man cast into the spotlight". However, later episodes showed Mr. Bean dropping from the night sky in a deserted London street against the backdrop of St Paul's Cathedral. At the end of episodes three and six he is also shown being sucked right back up into the sky in the respective background scenes (black scene in episode 3 and street scene in episode 6). Atkinson has acknowledged that Mr. Bean "has an alien aspect to him". In the animated series (episode, "Double Trouble") he is taken inside a spacecraft with "aliens" who look exactly like him and even have their own plushy toys. In an homage, the aliens send him back home in a beam of light and music similar to the opening of the original live-action Mr. Bean series.

== Clothing ==
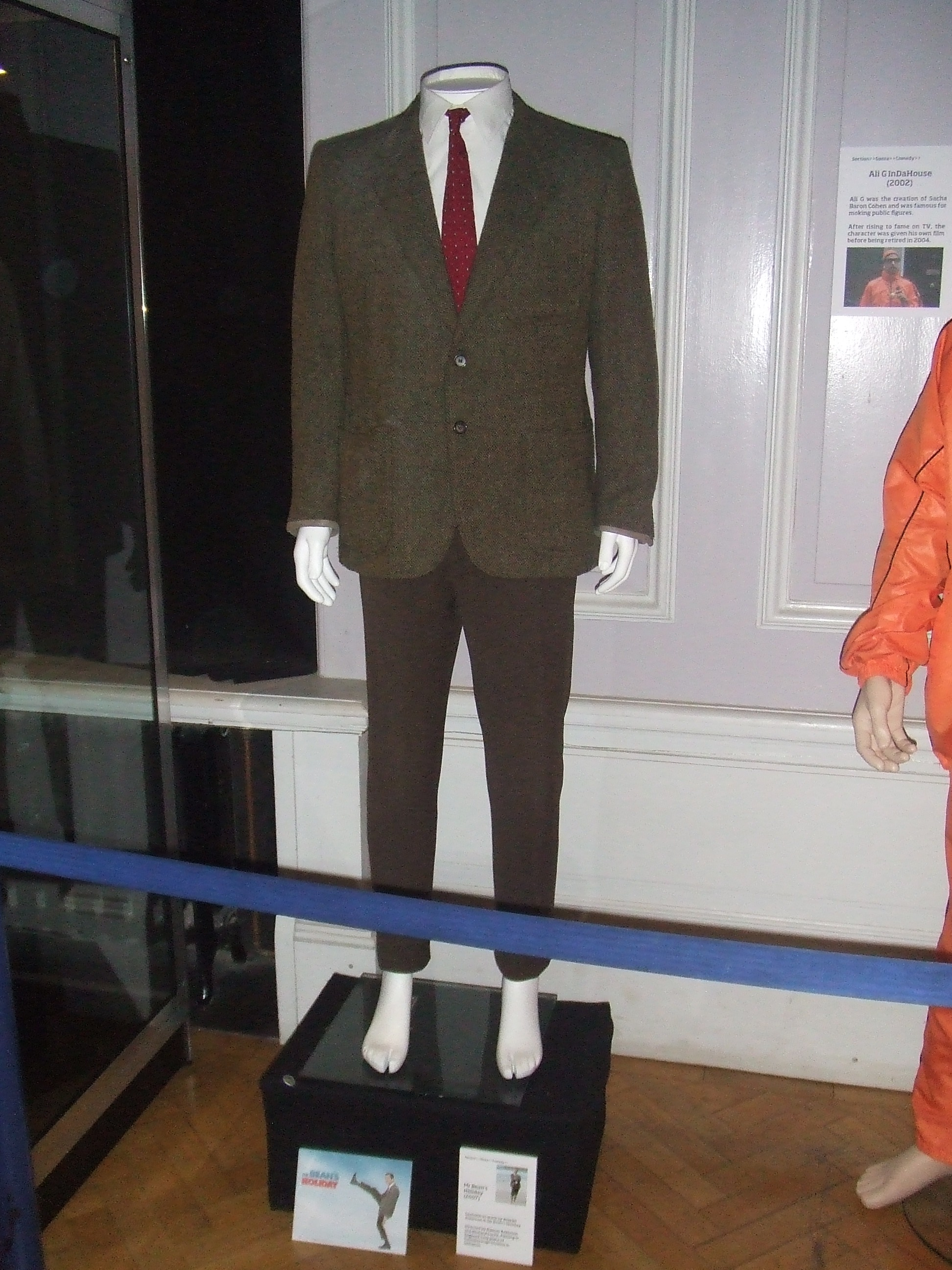
Classic Mr. Bean clothing displayed at the London Film Museum

Mr. Bean is usually seen wearing a brown tweed jacket with elbow patches, a white shirt, a thin red tie, brown trousers, gray socks, black shoes and a black digital calculator watch. He occasionally changes his outfit to suit the scene he is in.

In the episode "The Return of Mr. Bean", when Bean is heading to a fancy restaurant to celebrate his birthday, he wears a grey suit with a dark red tie. In the same episode, he wears a tuxedo. In the episode "The Curse of Mr. Bean", when Bean is heading for the park to make a sandwich for his lunch, he wears a long dark green overcoat with a light green shirt and a dark green tie. In the same episode when Bean goes to watch a horror film with his girlfriend, he is wearing his trademark clothes but with a light coloured brown crewneck sweater instead of his trademark brown tweed jacket.

== Personality ==
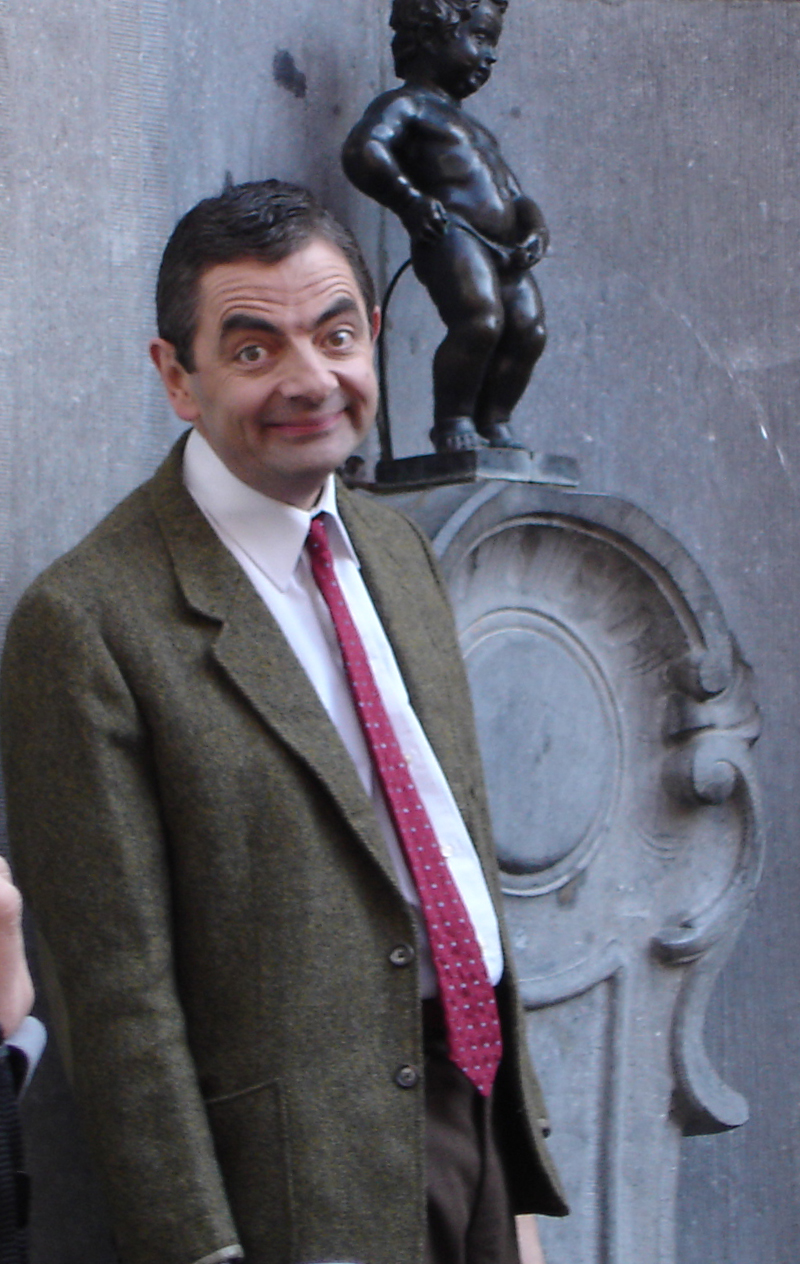
Rowan Atkinson as Mr. Bean in 2007 next to Manneken Pis in Brussels

Mr. Bean is immature, self-absorbed, extremely competitive and brings various abnormal schemes and contrivances to everyday tasks. He rarely speaks, and when he does, it is normally only a few mumbled words which are in a comically low-pitched voice. Mr. Bean often seems unmindful of basic aspects of the way the world works, and the programme typically features his attempts at what would generally be considered simple activities, such as going for a swim, using a television set, redecorating, or attending church. The humour largely comes from his original (and often absurd) solutions to problems – usually self-inflicted – and his total disregard for others when solving them, his pettiness and occasional malevolence. Atkinson himself has stated in various interviews on the character.

Mr Bean is a child at heart. He is a child trapped in a man's body so all the jokes involving Mr Bean are fairly sort of silly childish things.

Mr Bean is a very unpleasant character. He is a natural-born anarchist, he's incredibly selfish, incredibly childish. He is aged 11 really, mentally. He hasn't moved on and he never will.

== Origin ==
The character of Mr. Bean was developed while Rowan Atkinson was studying for his master's degree in electrical engineering at The Queen's College, Oxford. A sketch featuring Bean was performed at the Edinburgh Fringe in the early 1980s. Robert Box, a similar character also played by Atkinson, appears in the one-off 1979 ITV sitcom Canned Laughter which also features routines used in the motion picture in 1997.

One of Bean's earliest appearances occurred at the "Just for Laughs" comedy festival in Montreal, Quebec, Canada, in 1987. When programme coordinators were scheduling him into the festival programme, Atkinson insisted that he perform on the French-speaking bill rather than the English-speaking programme. Having no French dialogue in his act at all, programme coordinators could not understand why Atkinson wanted to perform on the French bill instead. As it turned out, Atkinson's act at the festival was a test platform for his character and he wanted to see how his character's physical comedy would fare on an international stage with a non-English speaking audience.

The character's name was not decided until after the first episode had been produced; a number of other vegetable-influenced names such as "Mr. Cauliflower" were explored.

=== Influences ===
Atkinson cited the earlier comedy character Monsieur Hulot, created by French comedian and director Jacques Tati, as an influence on the character. Atkinson also cited the influence of Peter Sellers, who had previously played similar "fumbling fool" characters, notably Hrundi Bakshi in The Party (1968) and Inspector Clouseau in The Pink Panther films. Stylistically, Mr. Bean is also similar to early silent films, relying purely upon physical comedy with Mr. Bean speaking very little dialogue (although like other live-action sitcoms during this period, it featured a laugh track). This has allowed the series to be sold worldwide without any significant changes to dialogue. In November 2012, Atkinson told The Daily Telegraph of his intentions to retire the character, stating that "someone in their fifties being childlike becomes a little sad." In 2016, however, Atkinson changed his mind by saying that he would never retire playing Mr. Bean.

== Appearances ==
Mr. Bean is the main character of both the titular TV series and its animated spin-off, as well as of feature films based on the series, Bean (1997) and Mr. Bean's Holiday (2007). Bean also made guest appearances at the London 2012 Olympics opening ceremony and in the 2017 Chinese film Top Funny Comedian: The Movie. Atkinson also portrayed Bean in several sketches for Comic Relief. Bean also made guest appearances in television programmes that are normally factual in nature, such as talk shows, often as publicity stunts to promote new episodes, VHS or DVD releases, or feature films. In addition, the character appeared in a wide range of television advertisements over the years, including campaigns for REMA 1000, M&M's, Fujifilm, Nissan Tino, Snickers and most recently for Etisalat in 2019.

In 2020, during the COVID-19 pandemic, Mr. Bean, in his animated incarnation, was featured in a public awareness campaign by the World Health Organization (WHO) promoting prevention measures against the coronavirus.

== Tributes ==
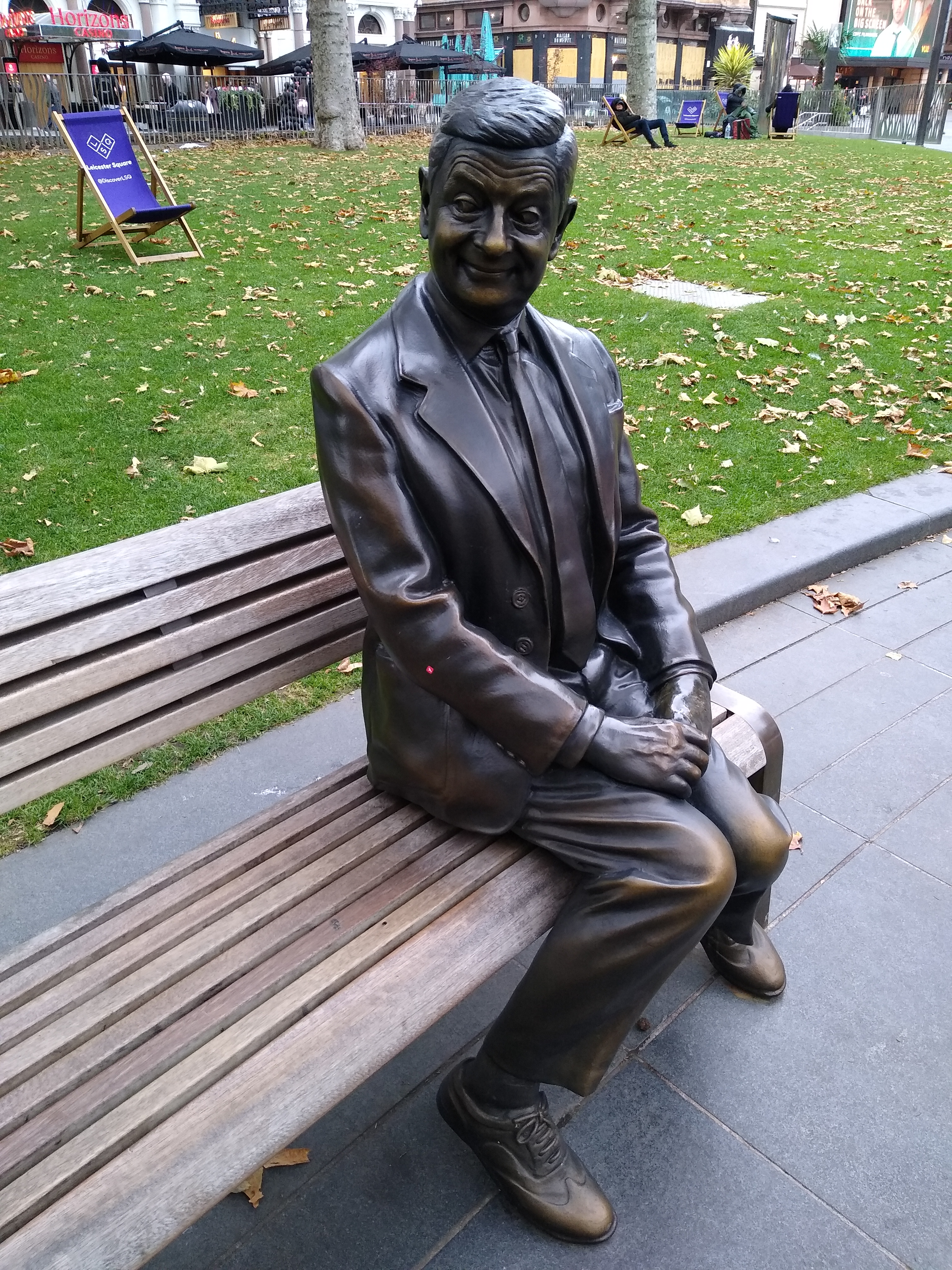
Statue of Mr. Bean at Leicester Square, London

In March 2020, a statue of Mr. Bean was unveiled at Leicester Square, in the West End of London, England, alongside other statues depicting icons and characters from British culture.
