= Robin Driscoll =

English actor, screenwriter and novelist (born 1956)

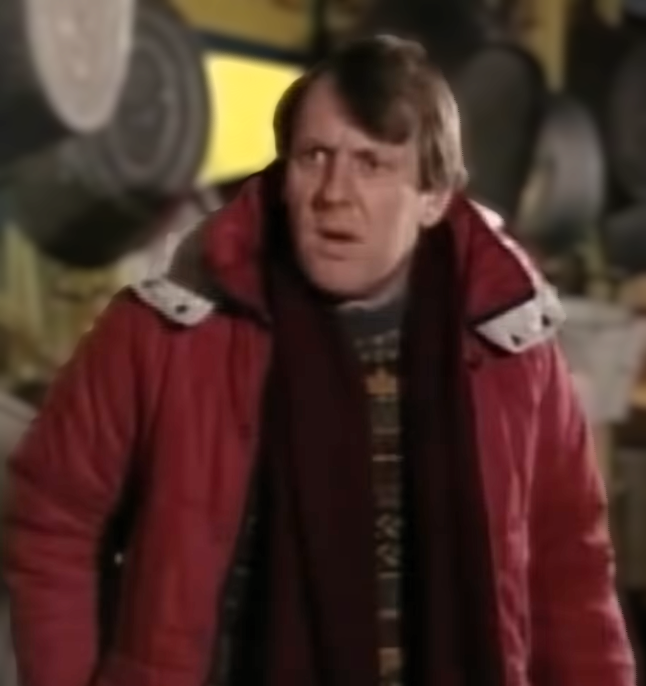
- Driscoll in a deleted scene from "Merry Christmas, Mr. Bean" (1992)
- Born: Robin L. Driscoll; 7 September 1956 (age 70); Worthing, West Sussex, England
- Occupations: Actor; Screenwriter; Novelist
- Years active: 1970s–present
- Notable work: Only Fools and Horses; Mr. Bean
- Children: At least 1

Robin Driscoll (born 7 September 1956) is an English actor, screenwriter and novelist. He is best known as a co-writer of Mr. Bean with Rowan Atkinson and Richard Curtis, in which he also had several supporting roles.

He and Atkinson appeared in Funny Business (1992). As an actor, Driscoll appeared in episodes of Only Fools and Horses ("The Jolly Boys' Outing"), Murder Most Horrid, Dear John, Alas Smith and Jones, and The Fast Show.

== Early life and education ==
Driscoll was born on 7 September 1956 in Worthing, West Sussex. He was raised in Sompting, West Sussex. He received his early education from Boundstone School and later attended Worthing Art College, now Northbrook College.

== Filmography ==
Year	Title	Role	Notes
1988	Dear John	Chopper	Television series
1989	Alas Smith and Jones	Various	Television series
1989	Only Fools and Horses	The Great Ramondo	Episode: "The Jolly Boys' Outing"
1992	Funny Business	Various	Film
1993	Murder Most Horrid	Reg	Television series
1994	The Fast Show	Various	Television series
1990–1995	Mr. Bean	Writer	Television series
1997	Bean	Writer	Film
2002–2004, 2015–2016	Mr. Bean: The Animated Series	Writer	24 episodes
2007	Mr. Bean's Holiday	Writer (screenplay)	Film

== Bibliography ==
Year	Title		Notes
2017	Rough Music	ISBN 1-916-06265-2	Republished in 2019
2018	The Unborn	ISBN 0-995-78832-4	First book in the Josie King Mysteries series
2019	Still Warm	ISBN 0-995-78839-1	Second book in the Josie King Mysteries series
2026 (Note: The paperback version was published in 2026 but the Kindle version was released in 2025.)	Remote	ISBN 1-916-06266-0	Third book in the Josie King Mysteries series
