= Sarah Lancashire filmography =

Filmography

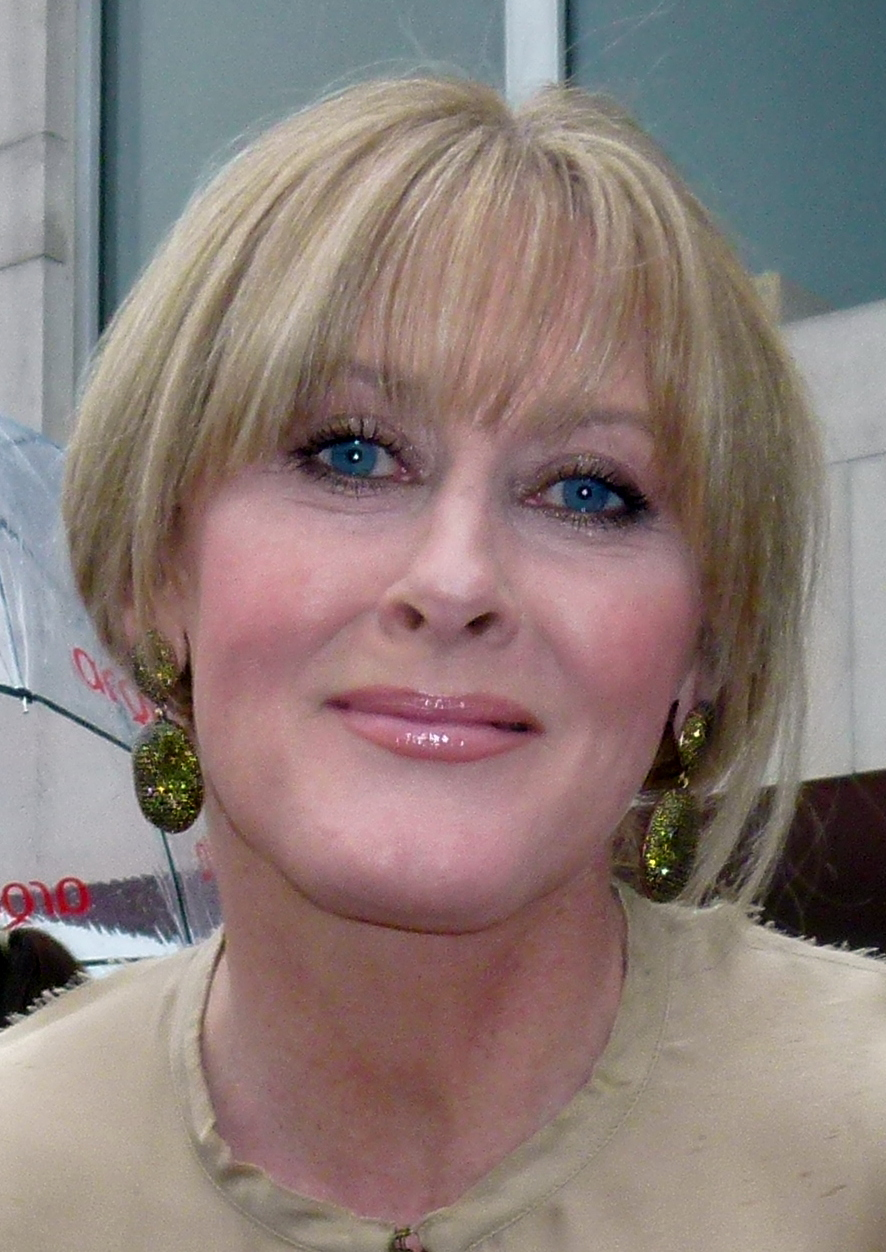
Lancashire in 2013

Sarah Lancashire is an English actress whose career began in 1986. Lancashire's first acting roles were in local theatre, with small guest roles in television dramas and sitcoms. After coming to public attention with roles in programmes such as Coronation Street, (1987, 1991–1996, 2000) Where the Heart Is (1997–1999) and Clocking Off (2000), Lancashire signed a two-year golden handcuffs contract with the ITV network, appearing exclusively in ITV1 programming for the next two years. Lancashire has continued to work extensively across a variety of television drama genres, including guest appearances, regular roles in returning series and with featured roles in standalone miniseries' and television films. Her more prolific work includes the drama series' Lark Rise to Candleford (2008–2011), Last Tango in Halifax (2012–2020) and Happy Valley (2014–2016, 2023).

Lancashire has appeared in the feature films And When Did You Last See Your Father? and Dad's Army and has returned to West End Theatre several times since her 1990 stint in Blood Brothers. Her combined acting credits have earned Lancashire a number of awards and nominations over a career spanning four decades and a prominent status within the British Television Industry of the 21st century. Lancashire was appointed Officer of the Order of the British Empire (OBE) in the 2017 Birthday Honours for services to drama.

== Television ==
=== Acting ===
Year	Title	Role	Notes
1987	Coronation Street	Wendy Farmer	1 episode
1988	Dramarama	Janice Dobbs	Series 6; Episode 1: "Forever Young"
1989	Bradley	Wendy	Episode 1
1989	Watching	Ms. Linden	Series 4; Episode 1: "Joking"
1991	About Face	Rebecca	Series 2; Episode 5: "Monkey Business"
1991	The Bill	Girl on Train	Series 7; Episode 105: "Breakout"
1991–1996, 2000	Coronation Street	Raquel Watts	532 episodes
1992	Exam Conditions	Secretary	Television film
1997	Bloomin' Marvellous	Liz Deakin	Episodes 1–8
1997–1999	Where the Heart is	Ruth Goddard	Series 1–3 (30 episodes)
1998	Verdict	Anne Cloves QC	Episode 1: "Split Second"
1999	Murder Most Horrid	Karen Sullivan	Series 4; Episode 2: "Going Solo"
2000	Clocking Off	Yvonne Kolakowski	Series 1; Episodes 1–6
2000	Seeing Red	Coral Atkins	Television film
2000	Chambers	Ruth Quirke	Series 1; Episodes 1–6
2000	My Fragile Heart	Trina Lavery	2-part miniseries
2001	Gentlemen's Relish	Violet Askey	Television film
2001	The Glass	Carol Parker	Miniseries; Episodes 1–6
2001	Back Home	Peggy Dickinson	Television film
2002	The Cry	Meg Bartlett	Miniseries; Episodes 1–4
2002	Birthday Girl	Rachel Jones	Television film
2002–2005	Rose and Maloney	Rose Linden	Series 1–3 (11 episodes)
2003	Sons & Lovers	Gertrude Morel	Miniseries; Episodes 1–4
2005	The Rotters' Club	Barbara Chase	Miniseries; Episodes 1–3
2005	Cherished	Angela Cannings	Television film
2006	Angel Cake	Elaine Wilson	Television film
2007	Skins	Mary Miles	Series 1; Episode 4: "Chris"
2007	Sex, The City and Me	Ruth Gilbert	Television film
2007	Oliver Twist	Mrs. Corney	Miniseries; Episodes 1–5
2008	Doctor Who	Miss Foster	Series 4; Episode 1: "Partners in Crime"
2008–2011	Lark Rise to Candleford	Adult Laura Timmins (voice)	Series 1–4 (40 episodes)
2009	All the Small Things	Esther Caddick	Episodes 1–6
2009	Wuthering Heights	Nelly Dean	2-part miniseries
2010	Five Daughters	Rosemary Nicholls	Miniseries; Episodes 1–3
2010	Inspector George Gently	Mallory Brown	Series 3; Episode 2: "Peace & Love"
2012	Upstairs Downstairs	Miss Whisset	Series 2; Episodes 5 & 6
2012–2013	The Paradise	Miss Audrey	Series 1 & 2 (10 episodes)
2012–2020	Last Tango in Halifax	Caroline Dawson	Series 1–5 (24 episodes)
2014, 2016, 2023	Happy Valley	Sgt. Catherine Cawood	Series 1–3 series (18 episodes)
2015	The Dresser	Madge	Television film
2017	School of Roars	Mrs. Twirlyhorn (voice)	CBeebies animation. Series 1 (18 episodes)
2018	Kiri	Miriam Grayson	Channel 4 miniseries; Episodes 1–4
2019	MotherFatherSon	Angela Howard	Main role. Miniseries; 6 episodes
2019	The Accident	Polly Bevan	Channel 4 miniseries; Episodes 1–4
2020	Talking Heads	Gwen Fedder	Episode 2: "An Ordinary Woman"
2022–2023	Julia	Julia Child	Lead role. Series 1 & 2 (16 episodes)
2024–present	Black Doves	Elizabeth Reed	Main role

=== Other ===
Year	Series	Credit	Notes
2004	The Afternoon Play	Director	Series 2; Episode 4: "Viva Las Blackpool"
2006	Disappearing Britain	Presenter	Series 1; Episode 1: "Beside the Seaside with Sarah Lancashire"
2023	Happy Valley	Executive producer	Series 3; Episodes 1–6

== Film ==
Year	Film	Role	Notes
2007	And When Did You Last See Your Father?	Beaty	
2016	Dad's Army	Mavis Pike	
2019	Yesterday	Liz (Liverpool Stranger)	
2021	Everybody's Talking About Jamie	Margaret New	

== Theatre credits ==
Year	Title	Role	Venue
1986	Pacific Overtures	Unknown	Manchester Central Library
1986	The Beauty Game	Denise	Manchester Central Library
1990	Blood Brothers	Linda	Albery Theatre, London
1991	Educating Rita	Susan "Rita" White	Queen's Theatre, Hornchurch
1993	Little Shop of Horrors	Audrey	Oldham Coliseum Theatre
2005–2006	Guys and Dolls	Miss Adelaide	Piccadilly Theatre, London
2011	Betty Blue Eyes	Joyce Chilvers	Novello Theatre, London
