= Dewi Humphreys =

Welsh television director

- Born: 6 February 1947 (age 79); Bangor, Wales
- Occupations: Television Director, Camera Operator, Producer
- Years active: 1969–present
- Employer: BBC
- Spouse: Dina Fish (m. 1982)
- Children: 5
- Parent(s): Emyr Humphreys; Elinor Myfanwy Jones
- Family: 3 siblings (including Siôn)

Dewi Humphreys (born 4 February 1947) is a Welsh born television director specialising in situation comedy. He is best known for directing a number of iconic comedy series for the BBC, including The Vicar of Dibley, 2point4 Children, My Family, Absolutely Fabulous, The Green, Green, Grass and Still Open All Hours.

== Early life ==
Humphreys was born in Ysbyty Dewi Sant, Bangor, the eldest child of novelist and poet Emyr Humphreys and Elinor Myfanwy (née Jones). His younger brother Siôn Humphreys is also a television director and producer. Humphreys was taught at St. Cyres, Penarth, his Welsh language teacher was the actor Noel Williams, whom he would later cast in his directorial debut Revival (1990) as part of the Wales Playhouse series for BBC Wales. Humphreys excelled in Welsh at school, subsequently gaining a GCE in the subject. Humphreys later studied Law at Sheffield University, he dropped out after a year and moved to Soho, London in the late 1960s to work in the film industry.

== Career ==
Humphreys progressed through the film industry via the camera department, operating initially as a clapper loader, focus puller and camera assistant on films like Pulp (1972), The 14 (1973), Gold (1974) and The Boys From Brazil (1978). He later became a camera operator employed on films including Quadrophenia (1979), Chariots of Fire (1981), Pink Floyd – The Wall (1982), The Missionary (1982), Monty Python's The Meaning of Life (1983), The Dresser (1983) and The Razor's Edge (1984). He subsequently moved into directing, where he directed a number of commercials.

In 1990 he moved into television directing, his early projects included the Screen One films Sticky Wickets (1990) and Tender Loving Care (1993). In 1993, he directed Telltale, a three-part drama series for HTV. The following year he moved into comedy, working on the anthology series Murder Most Horrid which starred Dawn French in various different roles. Later that year, he collaborated again with French on the sitcom The Vicar of Dibley.

Humphreys has worked on a number of comedy series including Chef!, A Pefect State, Bloomin' Marvelous, 2point4 Children, Harry Enfield's Brand Spanking New Show, My Family, High Stakes, Absolutely Fabulous, According to Bex, Nighty Night, The Green, Green, Grass, Teenage Kicks, The Old Guys, Little Crackers, Mount Pleasant, The Wright Way, Still Open All Hours and Mountain Goats.

In 1996, he directed the mini-series Neverwhere, which was devised by Lenny Henry and Neil Gaiman. Due to budgetry reasons it was shot on videotape but lit for film with the intention of filmizing it later for transmission, though this idea was later dropped. Upon its transmission, it was criticised for its garish, cheap and overlit appearance, deemed unsuitable for the video medium.

As part of the BBC's Millennium coverage in 2000, Humphreys directed alongside Matt Lipsey and Paul Jackson, The Nearly Complete and Utter History of Everything, a two part sketch show featuring comedy sketches based on well-known historical events, featuring stars of British comedy including Angus Deayton, Caroline Quentin, Harry Enfield, Jack Dee, Jennifer Saunders, Peter Davison, Ronnie Barker, Spike Milligan and Victoria Wood.

He directed taped performances of the Bottom stage shows Bottom 2001: An Arse Oddity (2001) and Bottom Live 2003: Weapons Grade Y-Fronts Tour (2003) respectively. Both shows were originally released directly to home video, but were later broadcast on Dave in 2008.

Humphreys directed all three episodes of Rock & Chips, a prequel series to Only Fools & Horses.

In 2016, Humphreys directed a one-off revival of Are You Being Served?, as part of the BBC's season of Landmark Sitcoms, a series of one-off specials featuring revived versions of classic BBC sitcoms, marking the 60th anniversary since the debut of the BBC's first TV sitcom Hancock's Half Hour.

== Selected filmography ==
=== Camera Department ===
Year	Title	Role	Notes
1969	The Bushbaby	Clapper Loader	Uncredited
1972	Pulp	Focus Puller	Uncredited
1973	The 14	Focus Puller	Uncredited
1973	Scorpio	Focus Puller	Uncredited
1974	The Black Windmill	Focus Puller	Uncredited
1974	Gold	Focus Puller	Uncredited
1975	Rosebud	Camera Assistant	Uncredited
1977	The Disappearance	1st Camera Assistant	Uncredited
1977	March or Die	Focus Puller	Uncredited
1978	The Boys from Brazil	Camera Assistant	
1979	Quadrophenia	Camera Operator	Uncredited
1979	Jesus	Camera Operator	
1981	Chariots of Fire	Camera Operator	
1981	For Your Eyes Only	Camera Operator	2nd unit footage
1981	Riding High	Camera Operator	
1982	Brimstone & Treacle	Camera Operator	
1982	The Missionary	Camera Operator	
1982	Pink Floyd – The Wall	Camera Operator	
1983	The Dresser	Camera Operator	
1983	Monty Python's The Meaning of Life	Camera Operator	
1984	The Razor's Edge	Camera Operator	

=== Director ===
Year	Title	Notes	Network
1990	Screen One	Episode: "Sticky Wickets"	BBC One
1990	Wales Playhouse	Episode: "Revival"	BBC Cymru Wales
1993	Screen One	Episode: "Tender Loving Care"	BBC One
1993	Telltale	3 episodes (mini series)	HTV
1994 – 1999	Murder Most Horrid	6 episodes	BBC Two
1994 – 1999	The Vicar of Dibley	10 episodes (plus special)	BBC One
1996	Chef!	6 episodes	BBC One
1996	Neverwhere	6 episodes (mini-series)	BBC Two
1996	Theatre of the Air	Episode: "I've Been Eddie Mostyn"	BBC Cymru Wales
1997	A Perfect State	7 episodes	BBC One
1997	Bloomin' Marvelous	8 episodes	BBC One
1998	Get Real	7 episodes	Carlton Television
1998	Harry Enfield & Chums	1 episode	BBC One
1999	2point4 Children	6 episodes	BBC One
2000	Harry Enfield's Brand Spanking New Show	12 episodes	Sky One
2000	The Nearly Complete and Utter History of Everything	2 episodes (mini-series)	BBC One
2001	Bottom 2001: An Arse Oddity	1 episode	Video-only release
2001	Harry Enfield Presents	2 episodes	BBC One
2001	High Stakes	6 episodes	ITV1
2001 – 2007	My Family	73 episodes	BBC One
2003	Absolutely Fabulous	8 episodes	BBC One
2003	Bottom Live 2003: Weapons Grade Y-Fronts Tour	1 episode	Video-only release
2005	According to Bex	8 episodes	BBC One
2005	Nighty Night	6 episodes	BBC Three
2006 – 2009	The Green, Green Grass	24 episodes	BBC One
2008	Teenage Kicks	8 episodes	ITV1
2009 – 2010	The Old Guys	12 episodes	BBC One
2010 – 2011	Little Crackers	2 episodes	Sky One
2010 – 2011	Rock & Chips	3 episodes	BBC One
2011 – 2012	Mount Pleasant	11 episodes	Sky One
2013	The Wright Way	6 episodes	BBC One
2013 – 2019	Still Open All Hours	41 episodes	BBC One
2015	Mountain Goats	6 episodes	BBC One
2016	Are You Being Served?	1 episode	BBC One
2016	Peter Pan Goes Wrong	TV movie	BBC One
