= Sandman (disambiguation) =

The Sandman is a figure in folklore who brings good sleep and dreams.

Sandman may also refer to:

== People ==
- Sandman (surname)
- Sandmann, German-language surname
- Mariano Rivera (born 1969), Panamanian-American baseball player nicknamed "Sandman"
- Adam Sandler (born 1966), American comedian and actor nicknamed "The Sandman" by fans
- Howard Sims (1917–2003), African-American tap dancer nicknamed "Sandman"
- Steve Abbott (comedian) or The Sandman, Australian comedian
- The Sandman (wrestler), a ring name of retired professional wrestler Jim Fullington (born 1963)
- Homeboy Sandman, American rapper

== Animals ==
- Sandman (horse), an American thoroughbred horse

== Arts, entertainment and media ==
=== Audio dramas ===
- "The Sandman", a 2002 release from Doctor Who: The Monthly Adventures
- The Sandman (audio drama), a 2020 adaptation of Neil Gaiman's comic books

=== Fictional characters ===
- Sandman (DC Comics), the name of many superhero characters published by DC Comics
  - Sandman (Wesley Dodds), a comic book superhero first appearing in the 1930s
  - Sandman (Sandy Hawkins), former sidekick of Wesley Dodds
  - Dream (Sandman), a godlike entity and personification of dreaming
- Sandman (Dungeons & Dragons), a creature in the Dungeons & Dragons series
- Sandman (Marvel Comics), a comic book super villain who can transform his body into sand
- Mr. Sandman (Punch-Out!!), a character in the video game Punch-Out!!
- Christian "The Sandman" Naylor, a villain in Death Warrant
- Sandman, a character in JoJo's Bizarre Adventure.
- Klein Sandman, the leader of the protagonists from Gravion
- Sandman, a character on Bubba the Love Sponge's radio show
- Sandman, a character in Call of Duty: Modern Warfare 3
- Sandman, a profession in Logan's Run
- Sandman, a character in Rise of the Guardians
- Sandman, a character in The Real Ghostbusters episode "Sandman, Dream Me A Dream"
- Sandman, a character in The Santa Clause 2
- Sandmen, parasites in Dark•Matter for the roleplaying game Alternity
- The Sandman, a drug dealer in Scarface: The World Is Yours
- The Sandman, a lead character in Sleepstalker
- The title character of Nilus the Sandman, a 1990s Canadian animated series
- Sandmen, the carnivorous, rheum-infected zombies in the Doctor Who episode Sleep No More

=== Film ===
- Sandmann – Historien om en sosialistisk supermann (2005), a Norwegian documentary film by Jannicke Systad Jacobsen
- The Sandman (1932 film) a French drama film directed by André Hugon
- The Sandman (1991 film), a short horror stop-motion animation film
- The Sandman (1995 film), an American horror thriller film
- The Sandman (2000 film), a short film by the Brothers Quay
- S&Man (2006) or Sandman, an American pseudo-documentary film on horror films
- The Sandman (2007 film), a Spanish romantic drama film
- The Sandman (2011 film), a Swiss romantic comedy
- The Sandman (2017 film), an American horror film

=== Television ===
==== Episodes ====
- "Sabrina, the Sandman", Sabrina the Teenage Witch (1996) season 3, episode 23 (1999)
- "Sandman", Pacific Blue season 3, episode 6 (1997)
- "Sandman", Spider-Man (2017) season 1, episode 7 (2017)
- "Sandman", Urban Gothic series 2, episode 1 (2001)
- "The Sandman", C-16: FBI episode 4 (1997)
- "The Sandman", Conrad Nagel Theater episode 14 (1955)
- "The Sandman", Criminal Minds season 11, episode 17 (2016)
- "The Sandman", Mr. Mom episode 4 (2019)
- "The Sandman", Mona the Vampire season 4, episode 11a (2004)
- "The Sandman", Naked City season 1, episode 32 (1959)
- "The Sandman", Prisoners of Gravity season 5, episode 3 (1993)
- "The Sandman", Space Ghost episode 3b (1966)
- "The Sandman", T.H.E. Cat episode 2 (1966)

==== Shows ====
- The Sandman (TV series), an American television series

=== Literature ===
- The Sandman (children's book), a 2008 children's book by Ralph Fletcher
- The Sandman (novel), a 1984 novel by Miles Gibson
- The Sandman (comic book), a DC Vertigo comic book series by Neil Gaiman (1989 onwards)
- "The Sandman" (short story), an 1817 story by E. T. A. Hoffmann
  - Sandmann (comic book), a 2019 comic book by Michael Mikolajczak and Jacek Piotrowski, continuation of Hoffmann's story

=== Music ===
- The Sandmen, a Danish rock band best known from the film Nattevagten
- Sandman (album), a 1976 album by Harry Nilsson
- Sandman (magazine), a British music magazine

==== Songs ====
- "Sandman" or "Enter Sandman", by Metallica
- "Mr. Sandman", written by Pat Ballard, also recorded as "Sandman"
- "Sandman", by America from the debut album America
- "Sandman", by Beatallica from the 2007 album Sgt. Hetfield's Motorbreath Pub Band
- "Sandman", by English band Hurts from the album Exile
- "The Sandman", by Heavenly from the 2001 album Sign of the Winner
- "Sandman", performed by Kirsty McGee
- "Sandman", by Yung Lean from the album Unknown Memory
- "Sandman", by Ed Sheeran from the album =
- "Sandman", by ASAP Rocky from the album Live. Love. ASAP
- "Sandmann", by Oomph! from the album Monster

=== Games ===
- Sandman: Map of Halaal, a 1985 table-top role-playing game

== Other uses ==
- Sandman Hotels, a group of Canadian hotels and restaurant companies
- Sandman Centre, a multi-purpose arena in Kamloops, British Columbia, Canada
- Holden Sandman, a Holden nameplate, a sports coupé utility and panel van (1978 to 1980), and coupé utility and wagon (2015)

== See also ==
- Mr. Sandman (disambiguation)
- Sandmännchen, two different German children's bedtime television programs starting in 1958
