= Burton F. Beers =

American historian and professor (1927–2016)

- Born: Burton Floyd Beers; September 13, 1927; Chemung, New York, U.S.
- Died: January 30, 2016 (aged 88); Greenville, North Carolina, U.S.
- Citizenship: American
- Occupations: Historian, professor, author
- Known for: Textbooks on world history and Asian studies
- Spouse: Pauline Cone Beers (m. 1952-2015)
- Awards: Alexander Quarles Holladay Medal (1992); Watauga Medal (1998)

Academic background
- Education: Hobart College (BA); Duke University (MA, PhD)

Academic work
- Discipline: Asian Studies, United States Far Eastern policy
- Institutions: North Carolina State University

Burton Floyd Beers (September 13, 1927 – January 30, 2016) was an American historian, educator, and author. He was a member of the faculty in the Department of History at North Carolina State University (NC State) from 1955 until his retirement in 1996. He was an expert on United States Far Eastern policy and was well known for his widely used textbooks on world history and Asian studies, including World History: Patterns of Civilization.

== Early life and education ==
Beers was born in Chemung, New York, on September 13, 1927, the son of Alice W. and Franklyn M. Beers.

He received his undergraduate degree from Hobart College. He then attended Duke University, where he earned a Master of Arts in history in 1952 and a Doctor of Philosophy in history in 1956.

== Academic career ==
Beers joined the faculty of North Carolina State University in 1955 as an instructor in the Department of History.

He was a Fellow in East Asian Studies at the Ford Foundation at Harvard University from 1959 to 1960, and a Fulbright Lecturer at National Taiwan University from 1966 to 1967. Over his long career at NC State, Beers earned a reputation as a dedicated teacher-scholar and an advocate for public education.

He was named Alumni Distinguished Professor in 1970. He served as head of the Department of History from 1981 to 1985. In 1992, he received the Alexander Quarles Holladay Medal for Excellence, the highest honor given by the university to its faculty members. In 1998, he was awarded the Watauga Medal for significant contributions to the advancement of the university. He retired from NC State in 1996.

== Research and publications ==
Beers was a leading expert on United States Far Eastern policy and the history of East Asia. He was a member of the education advisory board of the Asia Society from 1977 to 1981. His papers, which include personal correspondence, records of his tenure as a Fulbright Scholar, and material relating to his books and travels to various Asian countries, are held in the Special Collections Research Center at the NCSU Libraries.

He revised a well-known textbook, The Far East, which was originally written by his major professor, Paul Clyde. He also authored China in Old Photographs, 1860-1910, a book selected from the collection of the Museum of the American China Trade. Beers is perhaps best known for his work as editor-in-chief and author of the widely used school textbook World History: Patterns of Civilization, first published by Prentice Hall in 1983.

The textbook presented a chronological survey of world history from the earliest civilizations to the present and was used in high school classrooms for many years. He also served as editor-in-chief for Living in Our World. In the 1990s, he served as chief executive editor of the Humanities Extension/Publications social studies book project. Under his leadership, textbooks for grades 4, 5, 6 and 7 were completed and adopted by the State Board of Education. In 1986, he and Murray Downs published North Carolina State University: A Pictorial History. His first monograph, Vain Endeavor: Robert Lansing's Attempts to End the American-Japanese Rivalry, was published by Duke University Press in 1962.

== Awards and honors ==
Throughout his career, Beers received numerous awards for his teaching, scholarship, and service. He became the first recipient of the Alexander Quarles Holladay Medal for Excellence in 1992. In addition to the Holladay Medal and the Watauga Medal, he received the Christopher Crittenden Memorial Award from the North Carolina Literary and Historical Association in 1993 for his contributions to North Carolina history. He was also awarded two Outstanding Teacher Awards during his career at NC State. He also received the Hobart College Alumni Association Medal of Excellence in 1994. He was asked to deliver the university's Founders Day Address in 1976.

== Personal life ==
Beers was married to his wife, Pauline Cone Beers, for sixty-two years until her death in 2015. He died on January 30, 2016, in Greenville, North Carolina.
