= Ann Emery =

British actress

- Born: 12 March 1930; London, England
- Died: 28 September 2016 (aged 86)
- Occupation: Actress
- Relatives: Dick Emery (half-brother)

Ann Emery (12 March 1930 – 28 September 2016) was a British actress.

== Early life and education ==
Educated at Mrs Smith's School for Young Ladies and the Cone Ripman School, Emery excelled in tap dancing, which led to her first stage role as a Babe in Babes in the Wood at King's Theatre.

== Career ==
=== Theatre ===
Emery had a long stage career that culminated in the creation of the role of Grandma in Billy Elliot the Musical. Reviewing the musical in The Guardian, Michael Billington noted, "... when Ann Emery, as Billy's gran, sings of her sour memories of her husband, we get on the other side of the stage a collective demonstration of the slow movements of the inebriated working-class male. It is the kind of effect that can only be achieved in a musical." Emery stayed with the production for five years until 2010. She appears on the Original London Cast Recording of the show, as well as a live-streamed performance of the show that was subsequently released on DVD. Following an appearance in Betty Blue Eyes, Emery returned to the role of Grandma, which she played until 8 November 2014, when she retired, aged 84.

In 1969, she appeared as Miss Meadows in Brer Rabbit and Uncle Remus at the Intimate Theatre, London. In 1975, she performed in a production of Oh What A Lovely War! at the Greenwood Theatre, Southwark.

From 1983 until 1986, she played Jennyanydots in the London production of Cats.

In 1992, she appeared in the national tour of the Kander and Ebb musical 70 Girls 70 with Dora Bryan. The following year, she played Jack's Mother in the Library Theatre Company production of Into the Woods. In 1996, she was part of the original London cast of Martin Guerre, and in 2000, she was in the company of the original London production of Hard Times the Musical, featuring on the recordings of both productions. In 1998, she performed in Hey, Mr Producer! a charity concert celebrating the career of Cameron Mackintosh which was released as an album and video.

She played Mrs Hopkins and understudied Patsy Rowlands as Mrs Pearce in Trevor Nunn's 2001 production of My Fair Lady (Royal National Theatre and the Theatre Royal, Drury Lane).

From April to September 2011, she played "Mother Dear" in Cameron Mackintosh's production of Betty Blue Eyes at the Novello Theatre. It was based on the 1984 film A Private Function by Alan Bennett and Malcolm Mowbray.

=== Television and film ===
Emery is possibly best known for playing Ethel Meaker in the BBC children's television programme Rentaghost. She played Ethel Rocket in Julia Jekyll and Harriet Hyde in 1995 and appeared in the 2007 film Wednesday. In 1999, she played a cleaner in the first episode of Miami 7, the first series featuring the pop group S Club 7, in which she appeared attempting to dance to one of the group's songs as they rehearsed in the opening scene.

== Personal life ==
Emery was the half-sister of actor and comedian Dick Emery.

In 2010, she received a lifetime achievement award from the British Music Hall Society.

Emery announced her retirement in 2015. She died on 28 September 2016, aged 86, two years to the day after the performance of Billy Elliot that was live streamed to cinemas, and subsequently put on DVD as Billy Live.

== Filmography ==
=== Film ===
Year	Title	Role	Notes
2014	Billy Elliot the Musical Live	Grandma	

=== Television ===
Year	Title	Role	Notes
1956	Without Love	Dancer	Television film
1976–1984	Rentaghost	Ethel Meaker	46 episodes
1981	The Deceivers	Various	Episode: "Impostors and Impersonators"
1984	Aladdin and the Forty Thieves	The Empress	Television film
1987	The Bill	Middle Aged Woman	Episode: "Blind Alleys, Clogged Roads"
1995–1998	Julia Jekyll and Harriet Hyde	Mrs. Rocket	17 episodes
1999	Miami 7	Cleaner	Episode: "Take Off"
