= List of awards and nominations received by Sarah Lancashire =

Sarah Lancashire awards and nominations
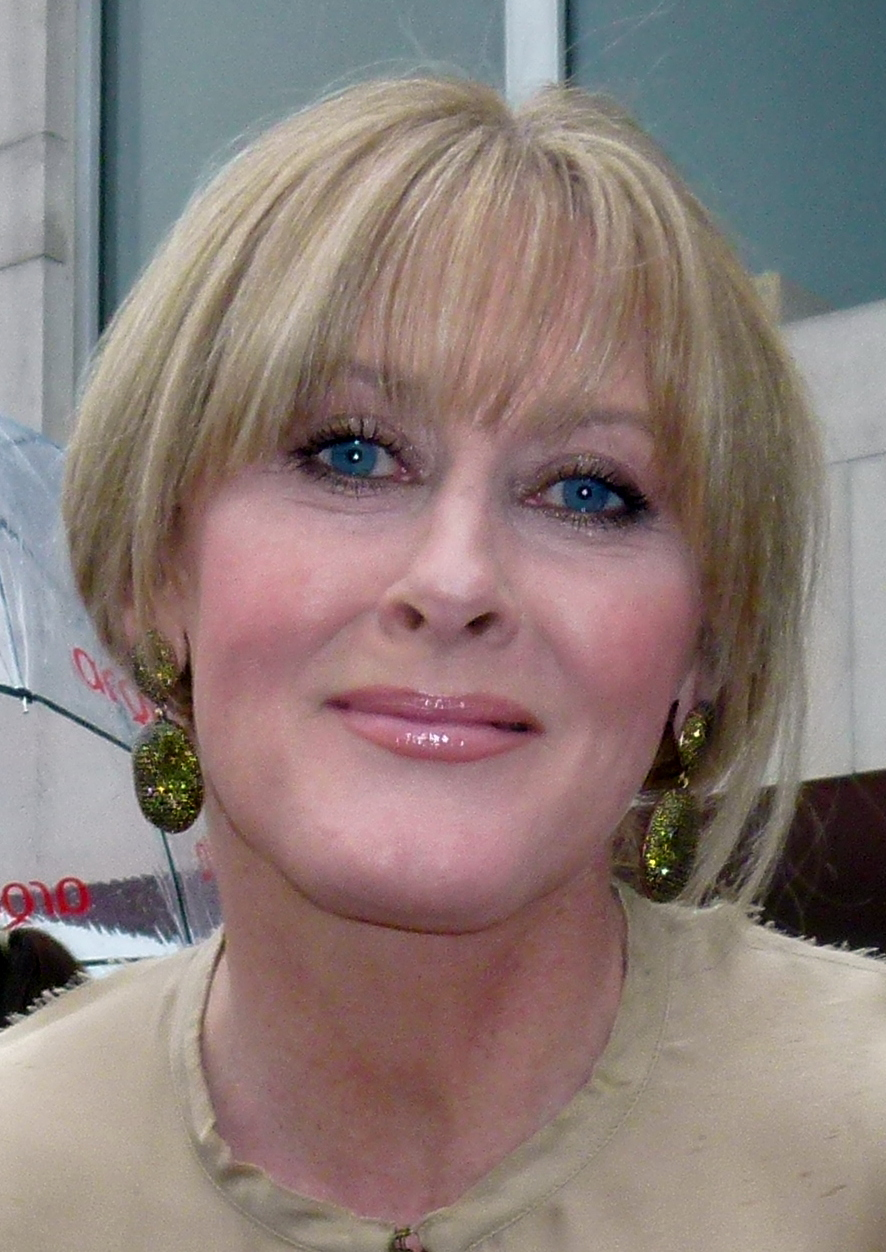
- Lancashire at the 2013 British Academy Television Awards
Awards and nominations
Award	Wins	Nominations
British Academy Television Awards	3	6
Laurence Olivier Awards	0	1
Golden Nymph Awards	2	2
National Television Awards	2	5

Totals (Note: Certain award groups do not simply award one winner. They acknowledge several different recipients, have runners-up, and have third place. Since this is a specific recognition and is different from losing an award, runner-up mentions are considered wins in this award tally. For simplification and to avoid errors, each award in this list has been presumed to have had a prior nomination.)
- Wins: 20
- Nominations: 36

Sarah Lancashire is a British actress whose professional career began in 1986. Over a career spanning four decades, Lancashire has been nominated for at least 36 television and theatre awards, winning 20 of those 36.

Lancashire's first industry award nomination was for Best Supporting Actress at the Manchester Evening News Theatre Awards. Later, Lancashire earned notoriety for her roles in Coronation Street (1991–1996, 2000), Where The Heart Is (1997–1999), Clocking Off and Seeing Red (both in 2000), for which she cumulatively earned one National Television Award and two further nominations, a TV Quick Award and the Television and Radio Industries Club award for Drama Performer of the Year in 2000. In 2002 Lancashire received her first Golden Nymph Award at the Monte Carlo Television Festival. In 2004, after an eighteen-month career break, she directed of a single episode of The Afternoon Play for which she earned a BAFTA TV Craft Award nomination. A return to West End theatre in the musical Betty Blue Eyes resulted in Lancashire receiving an Olivier Award nomination in 2012. Lancashire's role in the drama series Last Tango in Halifax (2012–2016) has earned her one win and one further nomination for the British Academy Television Award for Best Supporting Actress. Lancashire has since won further accolades for her leading role in Happy Valley (2014, 2016–), including the 2017 British Academy Television Award for Best Actress.

In 2014 she was listed as one of the 30 most powerful women in the British Television and Radio Industries by the Radio Times. In June 2017 Lancashire was appointed an Officer of the Order of the British Empire (OBE) for services to drama.

== Television Awards ==
=== British Academy Television Awards ===
The British Academy Television Awards are presented by the British Academy of Film and Television Arts (BAFTA), a charitable organisation established in 1947, which: "supports, promotes and develops the art forms of the moving image — film, television and video games — by identifying and rewarding excellence, inspiring practitioners and benefiting the public." Lancashire received six nominations in acting categories between 2013 and 2024, winning three.

Year	Work	Category	Result	Ref.
2013	Last Tango in Halifax	Best Supporting Actress	Nominated	
2014	Last Tango in Halifax	Best Supporting Actress	Won	
2015	Happy Valley	Best Actress	Nominated	
2017	Happy Valley	Best Actress	Won	
2023	Julia	Best Actress	Nominated	
2024	Happy Valley	Best Actress	Won	

==== British Academy Television Craft Awards ====
Having previously been handed out with the British Academy Television Awards, the BAFTA TV Craft awards were established in 2000 as a way to spotlight technical achievements, without being overshadowed by the production categories.

Year	Work	Category	Result	Ref.
2005	"Viva Las Blackpool" (The Afternoon Play)	Best New Director (fiction)	Nominated	

=== Broadcasting Press Guild Awards ===
The Broadcasting Press Guild (BPG) is a British association of journalists dedicated to the topic of general media issues. The Broadcasting Press Guild Awards have been awarded since 1974 to recognize outstanding programs and performances in British television and radio. The awards ceremony is considered an important media event in Britain.

Year	Work	Category	Result	Ref.
2015	Happy Valley; Last Tango in Halifax	Best Actress	Nominated	
2017	Happy Valley	Best Actress	Nominated	

=== Critics' Choice Television Awards ===
The Critics' Choice Television Awards are accolades that are presented annually by the Coks Broadcast Television Journalists Association (BTJA) (US). The Broadcast Television Journalists Association (BTJA) was founded in 2011 as an offshoot of the Broadcast Film Critics Association. According to the acting president of the BTJA, Joey Berlin, the Critics' Choice Television Awards were launched "to enhance access for broadcast journalists covering the television industry".

Year	Work	Category	Result	Ref.
2016	The Dresser	Best Supporting Actress in a Movie or Miniseries	Nominated	

=== Golden Nymph Awards (Monte-Carlo Television Festival) ===
The Monte-Carlo Television Festival was created by Prince Rainier III of Monaco to "encourage a new art form, in the service of peace and understanding between the people.". The festival ends with the Golden Nymph Award ceremony. The Golden Nymph statuettes are copies of the sculpture La nymphe Salmacis, the original of which is still exhibited at the Louvre museum in Paris.

Year	Work	Category	Result	Ref.
2002	The Cry	Best Performance by an Actress in a Mini-Series	Won	
2015	Happy Valley	Best Actress in a Drama Series	Won	

=== National Television Awards ===
The National Television Awards are a leading TV award event which is broadcast live on ITV, currently from The O2 Arena in London. Awards are decided based on millions of votes received via post, telephone and the internet. The first award ceremony was held in 1995.

Year	Work	Category	Result	Ref.
1996	Coronation Street	Most Popular Actress	Nominated	
1998	Where the Heart Is	Most Popular Actress	Nominated	
2000	Seeing Red	Most Popular Actress	Won	
2015	Happy Valley	Best Drama Performance	Nominated	
2017	Happy Valley	Best Drama Performance	Won	
2023	Happy Valley	Best Drama Performance	Won	

=== Royal Television Society Awards ===
The Royal Television Society was formed as The Television Society on 7 September 1927, The society was granted its Royal title in 1966. The Prince of Wales became patron of the Society in November 1997. The Royal Television Society Programme Awards represent a "gold standard of achievement in the TV industry". Regional RTS branches also hold their own award ceremonies including the Royal Television Society North-West, the Royal Television Society Midlands and the Royal Television Society Yorkshire.

==== Programme Awards (National) ====
Year	Work	Category	Result	Ref.
2015	Happy Valley	Best Actor (female)	Won	
2023	Herself	Outstanding Achievement Award	Won	
2024	Happy Valley	Best Actor (female)	Pending	

==== Regional Awards ====
Midlands

Year	Work	Category	Result	Ref.
2004	"Viva Las Blackpool" (The Afternoon Play)	Best New Talent	Won	

North-West

Year	Work	Category	Result	Ref.
1996	Coronation Street	Best Actress	Won	
2013	Last Tango in Halifax	Best Performance in a Single Drama or Drama Series	Nominated	
2014	Happy Valley	Best Actress in a Drama Series	Won	
2016	Happy Valley	Best Drama Performance (female)	Won	

Yorkshire

Year	Work	Category	Result	Ref.
2015	Happy Valley	Onscreen performance	Won	
2016	Happy Valley	Best Actor	Won	

=== Satellite Awards ===
The Satellite Awards are annual awards given by the International Press Academy that are commonly noted in entertainment industry journals and blogs.

Year	Work	Category	Result	Ref.
2015	Happy Valley	Best Actress – Miniseries or Television Film	Nominated	
2017	Happy Valley	Best Actress – Television Series Drama	Nominated	

=== Television and Radio Industries Club Awards ===
The Television and Radio Industries Club was formed in 1931 with the founding aim "to promote mutual understanding and good will amongst those engaged in the audio, visual, communication and allied industries." The first TRIC Awards ceremony was held in April 1969. The awards are voted for by member of the industry rather than a judging panel or committee.

Year	Work	Category	Result	Ref.
2001	Seeing Red; Clocking Off	Drama Performer of the Year	Won	

=== TV Quick and TV Choice Awards ===
The TV Choice Awards, previously known as the TV Quick Awards, are awarded annually based on a public vote by both the readership of TV Choice, a weekly television listings magazine, and the wider public. The awards ceremony celebrated its 20th anniversary in 2016.

Year	Work	Category	Result	Ref.
2001	Seeing Red; Clocking Off	Best Actress	Won	
2014	Happy Valley	Best Actress	Won	
2016	Happy Valley	Best Actress	Won	

=== Other ===
Year	Award Ceremony	Nominated work	Category	Result	Ref.
2004	Birmingham Screen Festival Awards	"Viva Las Blackpool"; The Afternoon Play	Best Newcomer	Won	
2014	C21 Drama Awards	Happy Valley	Best performance in a Drama Series	Won	
2014	Crime Thriller Awards	Happy Valley	Best Actress	Nominated	
2016	TVTimes Awards	Happy Valley	Favourite Actress	Won	

== Theatre Awards ==
=== Laurence Olivier Awards ===
The Laurence Olivier Awards, are presented annually by the Society of London Theatre to recognise excellence in professional theatre in London at an annual ceremony in the capital. The awards were first established in 1976 by the Society of London Theatre as the Society of West End Awards. In 1984, British actor Laurence Olivier gave his consent for the awards to be renamed in his honour and they became known as the Laurence Olivier Awards. The Awards are judged by four separate panels for theatre, opera, dance, and Affiliate.

Year	Work	Category	Result	Ref.
2012	Betty Blue Eyes	Best Actress in a Musical	Nominated	

=== Manchester Evening News Theatre Awards ===
The Manchester Evening News Theatre Awards are awards that celebrate achievements in local theatre, first held in 1981 and voted on by a panel of experts.

Year	Work	Category	Result	Ref.
1986	The Beauty Game	Best Supporting Actress	Nominated	

=== Whatsonstage.com Awards ===
The WhatsOnStage Awards, or alternatively, the WhatsOnStage "theatregoers' choice" prizes, formerly known as the Theatregoers' Choice Awards, are organised by the theatre website WhatsOnStage.com. The awards recognise performers and productions of British theatre with an emphasis on London's West End.

Year	Work	Category	Result	Ref.
2012	Betty Blue Eyes	Best Actress in a Musical	Nominated	
