= Mr. Sandman (disambiguation) =

"Mr. Sandman" is a 1954 song written by Pat Ballard.

Mr. Sandman may also refer to:

== Television episodes ==
- "Mr. Sandman" (ALF) (1990)
- "Mr. Sandman" (The Cosby Show) (1990)
- "Mr. Sandman" (Grimm) (2013)
- "Mr. Sandman" (Northern Exposure) (1994)
- "Mr. Sandman, Dream Me a Dream" (The Real Ghostbusters) (1986)

== Other uses ==
- Mr. Sandman or The Sandman (wrestler), ring names of retired professional wrestler Jim Fullington (born 1963)
- Mr. Sandman (Punch-Out!!), a character in the Punch-Out!! video game series
- "Mr. Sandman", a song on the album Tical by Method Man

== See also ==
- Windntide Mr. Sandman, 2010 National Dog Show Best in Show
- Sandman (disambiguation)
