= Miles Gibson =

English novelist, poet and artist

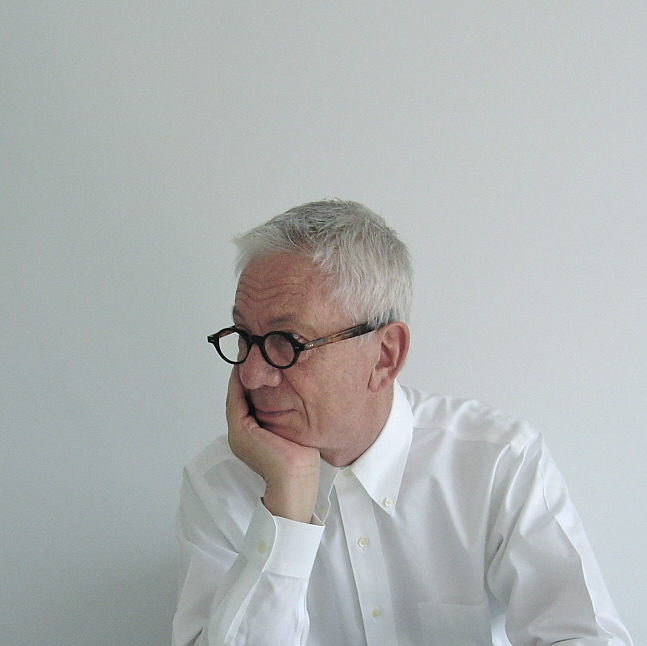
Miles Gibson

Miles Gibson (born 1947) is a reclusive English novelist, poet and artist.

== Early life ==
Gibson was born in a squatters camp at an abandoned World War II airbase, RAF Holmsley South in the New Forest, and raised in Mudeford, Dorset. The camp was dubbed Tintown and had been sanctioned by Christchurch Town Council as a way to ease postwar housing shortages. He was educated at Sandhills Infant School, Somerford Junior School and Somerford Secondary Modern – now The Grange School.

== Career ==
Upon leaving school he migrated to London and worked in advertising as a copywriter at J. Walter Thompson after winning a place in their Ten Most Ingenious Undergraduate Writers in Britain Today competition, despite lacking the primary qualification – a university education.

Gibson later flirted with Fleet Street as a regular contributor to The Daily Telegraph Magazine under the editorship of the renowned John Anstey. He was the Telegraph's runner-up Young Writer of the Year 1969.

Gibson has written fiction and science fiction, drama for BBC Radio 4, including 'The Church of the Cosmic Cheese' set in 16th century Italy, and starring Leslie Phillips and Hugh Dennis. His essays, poetry and short stories have appeared in various newspapers, journals and anthologies, including Echoes, Twenty-five years of the Telegraph Magazine, first published by WH Allen in 1989.

=== Fiction ===
Gibson's darkly satirical writing has been described as both "magic realism" and "absurdist fiction". Although his narratives remain linear in construction his employment of black humour, pastiche, and untrustworthy narrators places him firmly among the postmodernists.

- The Sandman (1984)
- Dancing with Mermaids (1985)
- Vinegar Soup (1987)
- Kingdom Swann (1990)
- Fascinated (1993)
- The Prisoner of Meadow Bank (1995)
- Mr Romance (2002)
- Einstein (2004)

When The Huffington Post ran a list of their favourite literary novelists to take the plunge into genre fiction, they included Gibson's Einstein: "Miles Gibson, one of the very few British authors to successfully pen a magical realism novel based in the UK, is known for his toying with genre. Maybe his most notable genre piece came in 2004 with sci-fi comedy Einstein, one of the genre's forgotten treasures."

His works for children include:

- Say Hello to the Buffalo, illustrated by Chris Riddell (1994)
- Little Archie (2004) illustrated by Neal Layton
- Whoops – There Goes Joe, also illustrated by Neal Layton (2006)

=== Poetry ===
His works include two collections of poetry, The Guilty Bystander (1970) and Permanent Damage (1973)

=== Adaptations ===
Kingdom Swann was adapted by David Nobbs as the feature-length comedy drama Gentlemen's Relish for BBC TV, starring Billy Connolly, Sarah Lancashire and Douglas Henshall (2001).

Maisie Can You Hear Me? By Miles Gibson was adapted by Cameron Lee Horace as a short drama film The Other Woman, starring Sophie Colquhoun, Lisa Ronaghan, Helen Mae Austin and Andy Anson.

=== Legacy ===
His manuscripts and papers are in the Special Collections of the Howard Gotlieb Archival Research Centre at Boston University in the United States.
