= Tee Off, Mr. Bean =

- Mr. Bean episode
- Episode no.: Episode 12
- Directed by: John Birkin
- Written by: Robin Driscoll; Rowan Atkinson
- Original air date: 20 September 1995
- Running time: 25:25

Guest appearances
- Marilyn Finlay; David Battley; Grant Masters; Jacqueline Defferary

Episode chronology
← Previous "Back to School Mr. Bean"	Next → "Goodnight Mr. Bean"

"Tee Off, Mr. Bean" is the twelfth episode of the British television series Mr. Bean, produced by Tiger Aspect Productions and Thames Television for Central Independent Television. It was first broadcast on ITV on 20 September 1995.

== Plot ==
=== Part One ===
Mr. Bean goes to the launderette, where he experiences a series of mishaps. Firstly, he realises that the price has increased from £2 to £3, so he retrieves another pound coin from a specially designed envelope in his trousers. A martial arts thug (Grant Masters) arrives and rudely pushes Bean away into the next front-load washing machine. Bean then proceeds to sort his laundry, including his Teddy and several pairs of underpants (each labelled with a different day of the week), into the washing machine.

Bean realises he only put five pairs of underwear in the machine and assumes the missing pair is Wednesday's, only to remember it is today, meaning he is wearing them. He changes behind a partition but mixes up his trousers with a lady's skirt (Jacqueline Defferary). Wearing the skirt, Bean walks by the thug, who playfully jeers him whilst he figures it out. Bean then spots a pair of underwear on the floor labelled "Sunday", realising it is the missing pair he was supposed to put in and not Wednesday's. He ponders retrieving the other pair but has no choice but to put them on as the machine's cycle is still running. However, the thug steps on them as he tries to put them on.

Finally, having had enough, Bean decides to get revenge by switching out the man's fabric softener with a cup of black coffee from the vending machine. This works, as the man does not notice this while pouring it in, but when he gets suspicious and sniffs the cup, Bean is forced to drink his cup to make it appear as if he is drinking coffee. Later, the thug berates the launderette's manager as his martial arts kit has been stained and discoloured by the coffee.

After retrieving his mutated washing (including a shrunken Teddy) from the clothes dryer, Bean attempts to retrieve his trousers from the lady's wash by climbing into a dryer, just as she returns. Not noticing Bean is inside, the lady closes the door and turns the machine on, resulting in Bean spinning inside the dryer along with the clothes.

=== Part Two ===
Bean heads to a golf course to play a game of mini golf. He scores a hole in one on the first hole, but on the second hole, he hits the ball onto the open grass. The owner (David Battley) warns him that he cannot use his hands to move the ball. After accidentally hitting the ball outside the golf course, Bean goes on a very elaborate journey as the ball ends up on a bus, inside a lady's shopping bag (she is later seen explaining the scene to a police officer), on top of a small boy's ice cream cone, up the exhaust pipe of a Proton Saga (causing the engine to explode), down a storm drain, into a litter bin, onto a bin lorry and finally onto the village green.

When Bean attempts to hitchhike back to the golf course, the first car that drives in is the blue Reliant, which Bean ignores, although the unseen driver opens the door for him. When another car pulls up, Bean cuts out the patch of turf the golf ball landed on with a penknife in order to allow him to return to the course without physically touching the ball.

As the sun sets and the ending credits roll, Bean makes it back to the course just as it is closing for the night and finally rolls the ball into the second hole, finishing with a final score of 3,427 strokes.

== Cast ==
- Rowan Atkinson – Mr. Bean
- Grant Masters – launderette bully
- Jacqueline Defferary – launderette woman
- David Battley – golf course owner
- Marilyn Finlay – woman driver

== Production ==
The opening featured a new recording of the choral theme, performed by the Choir of Christ Church Cathedral, Oxford. Act 1 was recorded at Teddington Studios before a live audience. The music of Wolfgang Amadeus Mozart is played in Act 1 too.

The Vauxhall Omega car that stops to give Bean a lift has the (already established) theme tune to The Vicar of Dibley (another Richard Curtis comedy) playing on the stereo. The music was also composed by Howard Goodall. The golf course and the village scenes were shot in Maidenhead. – also seen in the episode where Teddy enters the Pet Show. The shops where Mr. Bean attempts to putt his ball out of a lady's shopping bag are located on Shifford Crescent, Maidenhead.

Bean was seen boarding a South London 405 bus when his golf ball bounces into it. This bus route runs from Redhill to West Croydon station, even though the filming location for this scene is on Ray Mead Road, Maidenhead.
