= Elizabeth David: A Life in Recipes =

- Genre: Docudrama
- Written by: Amanda Coe
- Directed by: James Kent
- Starring: Catherine McCormack; Greg Wise; Karl Johnson; Jacqueline Defferary; Andrew Havill
- Country of origin: United Kingdom
- Original language: English

Production
- Executive producer: Leanne Klein
- Producer: Colette Flight Sias Wilson
- Running time: 90 minutes

Original release
- Network: BBC Two
- Release: 3 January 2006

Related
- George Orwell: A Life in Pictures; Agatha Christie: A Life in Pictures; H. G. Wells: War with the World

Elizabeth David: A Life in Recipes is a 2006 British drama television film directed by James Kent and starring Catherine McCormack, Greg Wise and Karl Johnson. Written by Amanda Coe, it is a depiction of the life of the cookery writer Elizabeth David. It first aired on the BBC in January 2006.

== Cast ==
- Catherine McCormack – Elizabeth David
- Greg Wise – Peter Higgins
- Karl Johnson – Norman Douglas
- Kieran O'Brien – Charles Gibson Cowan
- Jacqueline Defferary – Bulgie
- Andrew Havill – Tony David
- Tilly Blackwood – Doreen Thornton
- Richard Bailey – waiter
- Jane Lapotaire – Ernestine Carter
- Martin Savage – George
- Alan Cox – Cuthbert
- Emma Campbell-Jones – Frances
- Georgie Glen – Pamela
- Lucy Scott – Patricia
- Neville Phillips – Diner
- Penelope Beaumont – Mrs Diner
- Laura Lonsdale – Waitress
- Bart Ruspoli – Italian Doctor
- Sophie Duval – TV Reporter
