= The Dresser =

1980 play by Ronald Harwood

The Dresser is a 1980 West End and Broadway play by Ronald Harwood, which tells the story of an aging actor's personal assistant, who struggles to keep his charge's life together.

Harwood based the play on his experiences as dresser to English Shakespearean actor-manager Sir Donald Wolfit, who is the model for the character "Sir" in the play.

== Stage productions ==
=== UK ===
The play was first presented on 6 March 1980 at the Royal Exchange, Manchester and transferred to the Queen's Theatre in London on 30 April 1980, with Freddie Jones as "Sir" and Tom Courtenay as Norman. The play was nominated for Best Play at the Society of West End Theatre Awards (now known as the Laurence Olivier Awards) for 1980. In 2016, a production directed by Sean Foley and starring Ken Stott and Reece Shearsmith played theatres including the Duke of York's Theatre in London's West End.

=== Broadway ===
The play opened at the Brooks Atkinson Theatre on 9 November 1981 and ran for 200 performances, with Tom Courtenay reprising his performance as Norman and Paul Rogers as "Sir", union rules preventing Freddie Jones reprising the role. The play was nominated for the 1982 Tony Award for Best Play, Best Actor in a Play (Tom Courtenay) and the Drama Desk Award for Outstanding Actor in a Play (Paul Rogers).

== Film, television and radio adaptations ==
The play was adapted as a 1983 film of the same title, with a screenplay by Harwood. The film was directed by Peter Yates and produced by Yates with Ronald Harwood; and starred Albert Finney as "Sir" and Tom Courtenay as Norman, with Zena Walker as "Her Ladyship", Eileen Atkins as Madge and Edward Fox as Oxenby. Finney and Courtenay were both nominated for Academy Awards, BAFTA Awards and Golden Globe Awards for their performances, with Courtenay winning the Golden Globe Award for Best Actor – Motion Picture Drama in a tie with Robert Duvall in Tender Mercies.

A television version for the BBC was shown in the UK on 31 October 2015. Richard Eyre directed Anthony Hopkins as "Sir" and Ian McKellen as Norman, with Emily Watson as "Her Ladyship", Sarah Lancashire as Madge and Edward Fox as Thornton.

A radio adaptation for BBC Radio 4 was broadcast on 11 December 1993. It was adapted and directed by David Blount. Freddie Jones played Sir and Michael Palin played Norman.
