= Grant Masters =

English actor

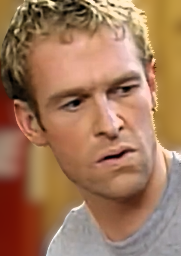
Masters in "Tee Off, Mr. Bean", a 1995 episode of Mr. Bean

Grant Masters is an English actor and comedian, known for his roles as Martin Campbell in the Channel 4 soap opera Hollyoaks and Sam Reid in the BBC soap opera Doctors.

An early role came in Cider with Rosie (1998). He also played Dan in Casualty, starred as DI Glenn Mateo in the third series of Thief Takers and has had roles in The Bill, Doctors, Peak Practice and EastEnders, as well as other British television sitcoms. He appears in Mr. Bean as the black belt thug on the episode "Tee Off, Mr. Bean". He starred in the 2018 sci-fi/horror film Await Further Instructions, and the 2019 sci-fi/thriller Dark Encounter.
