= Dancing with Mermaids =

1985 novel by Miles Gibson

- First edition
- Author: Miles Gibson
- Language: English
- Publisher: Heinemann (UK); E. P. Dutton (US)
- Publication date: 1985 (first edition)
- Publication place: United Kingdom
- Media type: Print
- Pages: 195 p.
- ISBN: 0434291315
- OCLC: 12804793

Dancing With Mermaids is the second novel by the English writer Miles Gibson. The novel includes elements of magic realism and erotica.

== Plot ==
The novel is set in the secluded fishing village of Rams Horn, once a fashionable Regency spa, at the mouth of the River Sheep, somewhere on the Dorset coast. Rams Horn is described by the author as ‘a memory, a lost cause, a carnival of ghosts, an ark of half-forgotten dreams’. The Financial Times described the setting as a secretive place ‘full of leery, venal, outsize, hideous and beautiful people’.

== Publication history ==
First published by William Heinemann, London, 1985. ISBN 0-434-29131-5. First US edition published by EP Dutton 1986. Reprinted in the UK by the Do Not Press 1997.

== Reception ==
The New Yorker described the novel as ‘a wild, funny, poetic exhalation that sparkles and hoots and flies’.
