= Sarah Lancashire =

English actress (born 1964)

Sarah Lancashire CBE
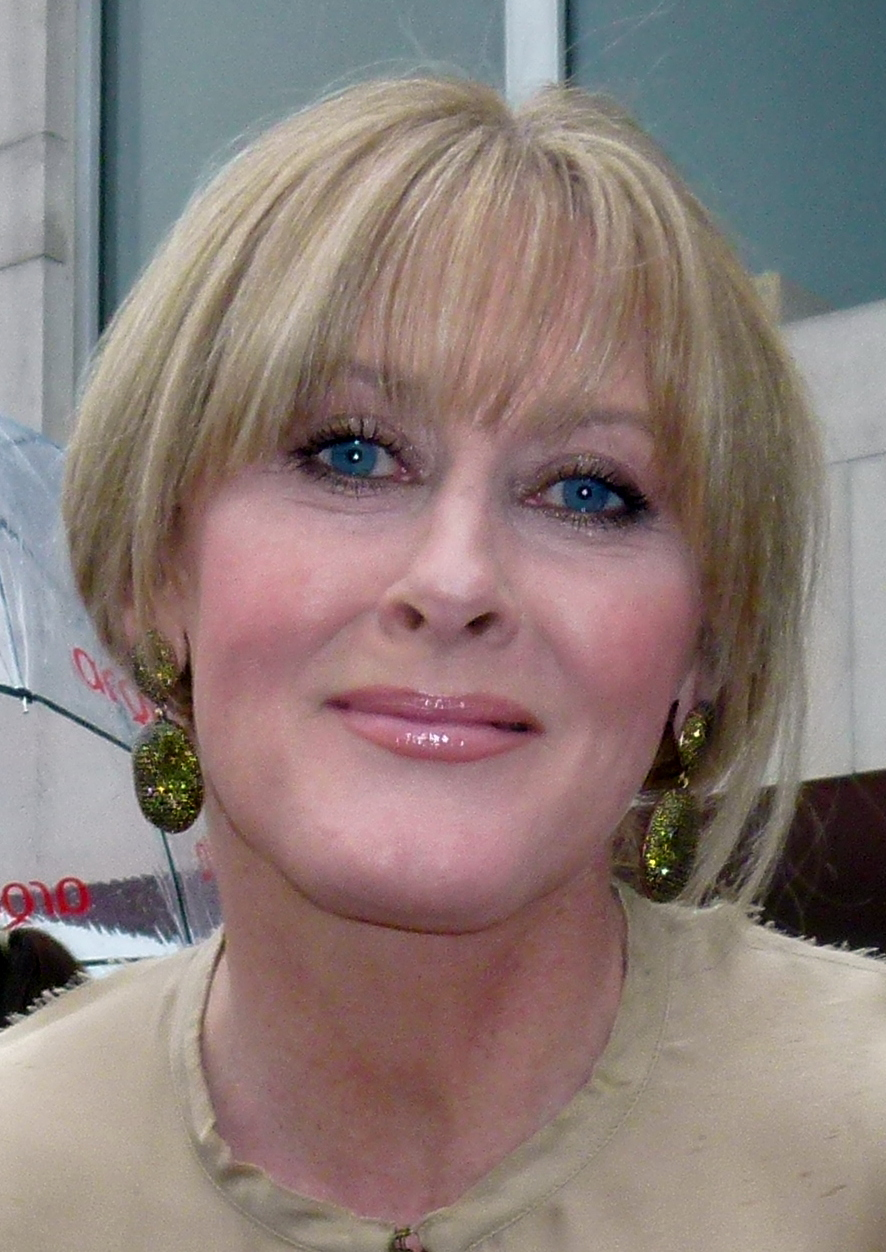
- Lancashire in 2013
- Born: Sarah-Jane Abigail Lancashire; 10 October 1964 (age 62); Urmston, Lancashire, England
- Education: Guildhall School of Music and Drama (BA)
- Occupation: Actress
- Years active: 1986–present
- Works: Full list
- Spouses: Gary Hargreaves (m. 1987; div. 1997) Peter Salmon (m. 2001)
- Children: 3
- Relatives: Geoffrey Lancashire (father)
- Awards: See full list

Sarah-Jane Abigail Lancashire (born 10 October 1964) is an English actress. Known for her work in television and theatre, she has received numerous accolades over a career spanning four decades, including three British Academy Television Awards and a nomination for an Olivier Award. She was appointed Officer of the Order of the British Empire (OBE) in the 2017 Birthday Honours for services to drama and was appointed Commander of the Order of the British Empire (CBE) in the 2025 New Year Honours.

Lancashire graduated from drama school in 1986 and began her career in local theatre. She went on to play regular characters on Coronation Street (1991–1996, 2000), and Where the Heart Is (1997–1999). After working for the BBC on the first series of Clocking Off (2000), she signed a two-year golden handcuffs contract with the ITV network in July 2000, making her the UK's highest-paid television actress at that time. Subsequent roles included Cherished (2005), Oliver Twist (2007), Lark Rise to Candleford narrator (2008–2011), and Five Daughters (2010).

Since the turn of the 2010s, Lancashire has been critically lauded for her roles in series such as The Paradise (2012), Last Tango in Halifax (2012–2020), Happy Valley (2014–2023), Kiri (2018), Julia (2022–2023) and Black Doves (2024–present). On stage, she has starred in West End productions of Blood Brothers (1990), Guys and Dolls (2005–2006), and Betty Blue Eyes (2011).

== Early life ==
Sarah-Jane Abigail Lancashire was born on 10 October 1964 in Urmston, Lancashire. The family moved to Oldham, Lancashire, her father's birthplace, in 1967. Her father, Geoffrey Lancashire (1933–2004), was a television scriptwriter for Coronation Street who also wrote situation comedies such as The Cuckoo Waltz. Her mother, Hilda, worked as Geoffrey's personal assistant. She has three brothers, one older, one younger and a twin. Lancashire was educated at Oldham Hulme Grammar School between 1976 and 1981. At the age of 17 she started to suffer clinical depression.

Lancashire has stated she was never driven by the ideas of fame and status. Her background had inspired an initial interest in working behind the scenes in television. She did not give serious thought to the performing arts until the age of 18. After winning a place at the Guildhall School of Music and Drama, Lancashire realised that acting was for her. She graduated in 1986, describing her time as a student there as "tremendous" but "seriously hard work and quite intimidating".

== Career ==
=== 1988–1990: Career beginnings ===
After rejection from several repertory theatre companies, Lancashire was given her first acting role by Howard Lloyd-Lewis, artistic director of the Manchester Library Theatre Company, which provided her with an Equity card. Lancashire performed two plays with the company, Pacific Overtures and The Beauty Game, which she has stated formed "the start of my career as an actor". She found her first professional acting experience "terrifying" as a result of the live audiences, recalling that, "because I wore a bathing costume in some of the scenes, I got heckled!" She also realised that taking risks or underperforming could have had consequences for her acting career. Her role as Denise in The Beauty Game earned her a nomination for Best Supporting Actress at the Manchester Evening News Theatre Awards.

During her early career, Lancashire found herself with large breaks between theatre appearances. To support herself financially, she worked as a drama tutor for five years at Salford University alongside her acting work.

Discussing Lancashire's time as a visiting lecturer in acting and characterisation, Ron Cook, Head of the University's School of Media, Music and Performance, said she had made a "significant impact" in the formative stages of the drama department at the university and had also directed student productions.

In 1987, Lancashire made a brief appearance in Coronation Street as Wendy Farmer, a prospective lodger of series regular Jack Duckworth (Bill Tarmey). In the late 1980s, she also appeared in an episode of the children's anthology series Dramarama, and a single episode of the ITV sitcom Watching.

In 1990, Lancashire received her "big break" – the role of Linda in a production of Willy Russell's Blood Brothers at the Albery Theatre. Although she thoroughly enjoyed performing in London's West End, she found it difficult to reconcile the experience with raising two young children in Manchester.

=== 1991–2000: Coronation Street and other series ===
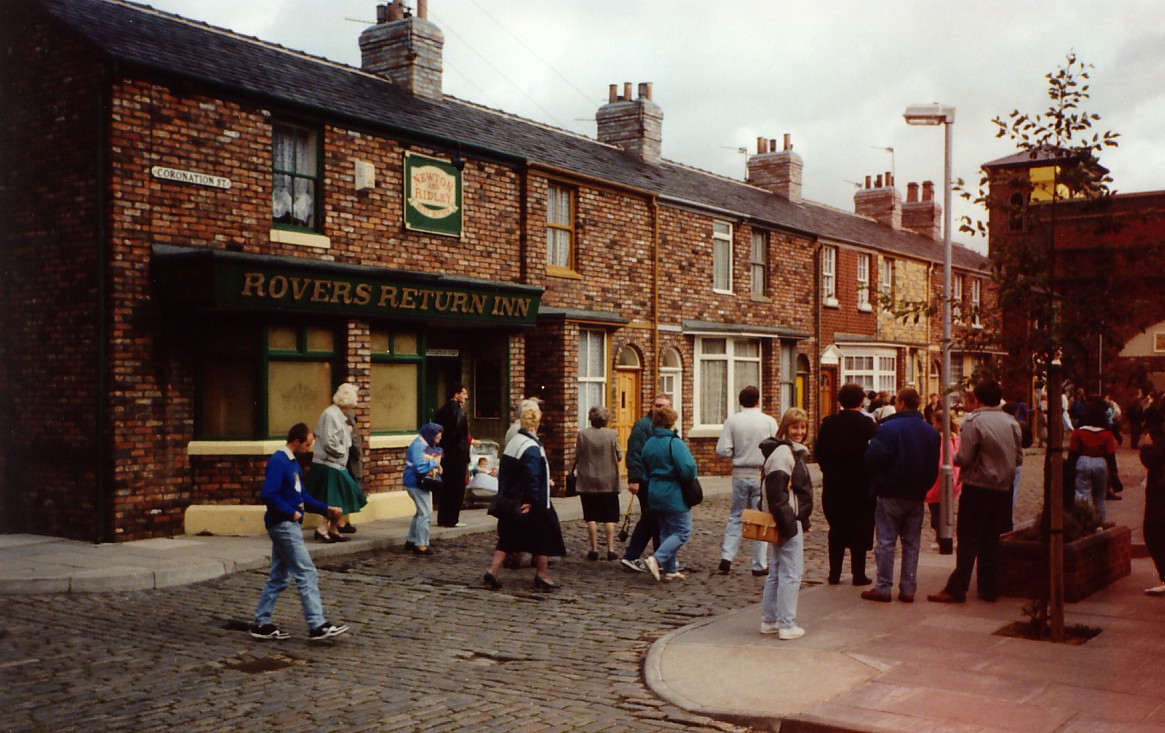
The Coronation Street set, pictured in 2005. Lancashire appeared in the serial for five years between 1991 and 1996

Two weeks after finishing her run in Blood Brothers, Lancashire auditioned for the role of new Coronation Street character Raquel Wolstenhulme, a colleague of supermarket employee Norman "Curly" Watts (Kevin Kennedy).

Lancashire joined on a three-month contract, continuing to teach at Salford University for another year. Raquel first appeared on 25 January 1991 and departed on 10 May; having moved to London to try to launch a modelling career. Lancashire had initially been reserved about Raquel's characterisation, observing her "acidic side" could have rendered her the "street bitch" had it been embellished. She took care to highlight Raquel's potential, playing against what had been written to make her more comic, evoking audience sympathy. Between 26 September and 19 October 1991, Lancashire played the title role in an adaptation of Educating Rita at the Queen's Theatre, Hornchurch. Following Raquel's reintroduction on 30 December 1991, Lancashire committed herself to Coronation Street full-time. She would remain in the series until 1996, earning a reported annual salary of £90,000.

In December 1995, Lancashire starred in the spin-off straight-to-video film Coronation Street – The Cruise, a 75-minute special detailing Raquel and Curly's honeymoon. The special was advertised as being exclusive to video, and 750,000 copies were sold, to the value of £10 million. Lancashire departed Coronation Street in 1996 due to her heavy work schedule and desire to pursue other projects. She had also tired of the fame the role brought her, shying away from personal appearances and interviews with television magazines. Her final scenes attracted 20 million viewers. Lancashire's performance in the role saw her nominated in the Most Popular Actress category at the 2nd National Television Awards in October 1996.

Lancashire's next role was district nurse Ruth Goddard in the ITV drama series Where the Heart Is, which began airing in 1997. Also in 1997 she filmed a situation comedy for the BBC, Bloomin' Marvellous, in which she played Liz, one half of an argumentative married couple trying for a baby.

However, owing to poor viewing figures and a damning critical response the sitcom was not renewed. Regarding the negative reception to the series, her co-star Clive Mantle sarcastically remarked "I've seen murderers and rapists get a better press than we did". Lancashire continued to star as Ruth Goddard in Where the Heart Is for its second and third series in 1998 and 1999. In 1998 she was nominated for her second National Television Award for Most Popular Actress. In February 1999 she made a guest appearance in the British dark comedy anthology series Murder Most Horrid alongside comedian Dawn French. The pair played two yachtswoman whose journey ends with fatal repercussions. In April it was announced that Lancashire would be quitting Where the Heart Is, despite an offered pay rise. At the time, Where the Heart is was the third most popular drama on British Television, regularly attracting 12 million viewers. Lancashire's decision was reportedly influenced by the series filming away from home, and a fear that remaining in the series long term would harm her career. In January 2000 she expanded on her decision, stating that Ruth "was too chocolate-boxy, no longer a challenge".

On 1 January 2000, Lancashire returned to Coronation Street for one episode in which Raquel asks Curly for a divorce. Lancashire felt it was an apt time to return, as she was now a more confident actress and wanted to portray Raquel again before she aged significantly. The series' producer at the time, Jane Macnaught, deemed Raquel one of Coronation Street's most popular ever characters and her return an opportunity for her "millions of fans" to learn what had become of her. Lancashire and Kennedy were the sole actors in the episode, the first to feature just two characters. From late January, Lancashire appeared as factory employee Yvonne Kolakowski, a widow with a dysfunctional personal life, in the BBC One drama series Clocking Off. Lancashire used her own experiences as a single mother in her characterisation. In March, she played actress Coral Atkins in the television film Seeing Red.

Lancashire found shooting the drama, which detailed Atkins' decision to quit her acting career in order to set up a care home for abused children, "mentally draining". Lancashire then spent eight weeks filming the BBC One legal sitcom Chambers in which she played "ambitious" and "bigoted" barrister Ruth Quirke. The series was aired from June 2000. Lancashire's final role in 2000 was in the two-part drama thriller My Fragile Heart. Lancashire's output in 2000 earned her several awards. She was voted best actress at the TV Quick Awards in September 2000 for her roles in Clocking Off and Seeing Red, and in October was voted Most Popular Actress at the 6th National Television Awards for Seeing Red. In March 2001 she was named Drama Performer of the Year by the Television and Radio Industries Club, with mention of her work in Clocking Off and Seeing Red.

=== 2000–2003: "Golden handcuffs" contract ===
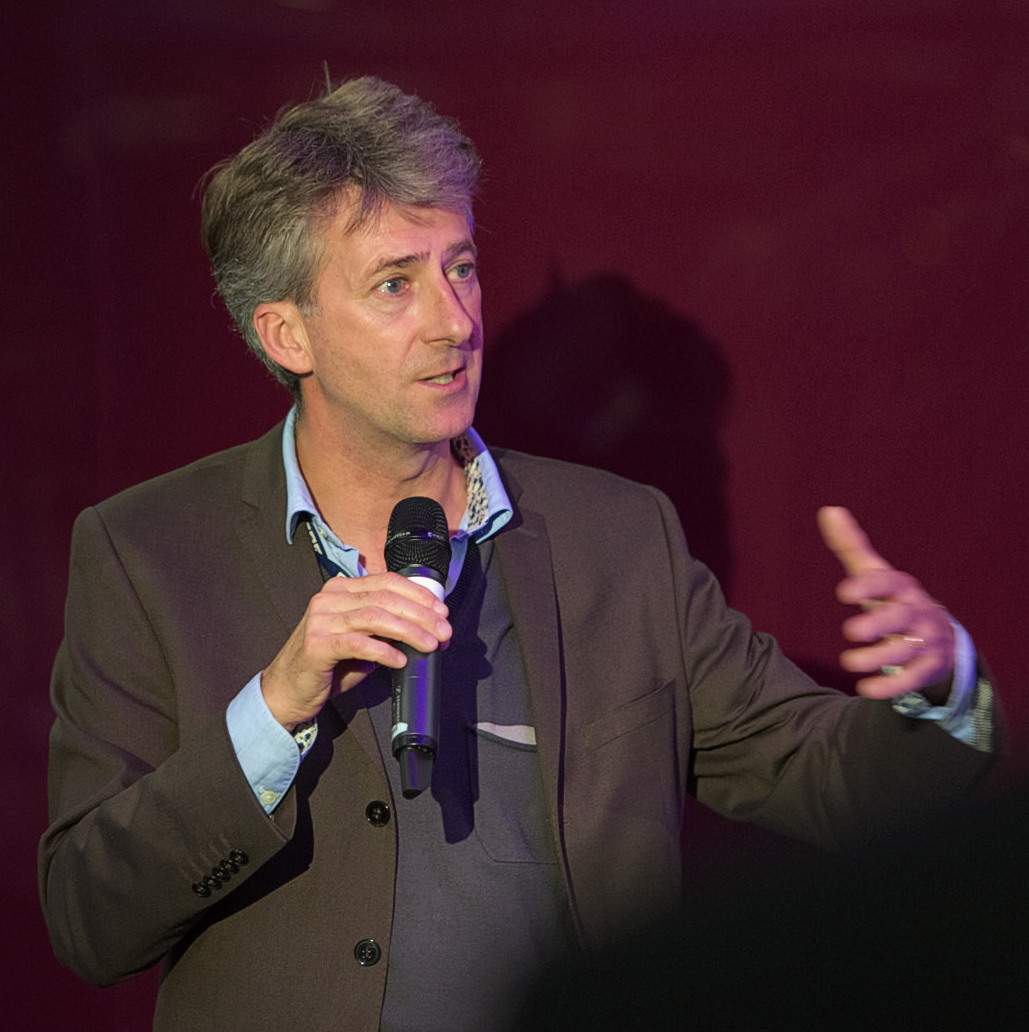
Lancashire's husband, the television executive Peter Salmon, pictured in 2012

Resulting from Lancashire's ability to connect with a television audience, ITV sought to secure her exclusively to their network in a two-year golden handcuffs deal, which was finalised in July 2000. Lancashire became the first actress to be given such a contract with ITV. The deal, worth £1.3 million, made Lancashire the highest-paid actress in British television. Discussing the exclusive signing ITV controller of drama Nick Elliott identified Lancashire as being someone with "a great range [who] creates a tremendous empathy with an audience". He also admitted that heavy interest in Lancashire from the BBC had been a factor in giving her the contract, and blocking her from working with other networks.

Her last role on BBC One during this period was comedy drama Gentleman's Relish, an adaptation of the Miles Gibson novel Kingdom Swann. The television film, which aired on New Year's Day 2001, was Lancashire's first in the costume drama genre; she played a housekeeper harbouring romantic feelings for her employer (Billy Connolly). Her first role under her new contract with ITV was the six-part drama The Glass opposite John Thaw. The series, which aired between May and June 2001 saw Lancashire star as a saleswoman for a double-glazing company who ends up caught in a love triangle with her boss and his nephew. In October Lancashire starred in an adaptation of the Michelle Magorian novel Back Home as Peggy Dickinson, a woman adjusting to life in post-war Britain after having been separated from her family during the war.

In March 2002, Lancashire received an Honorary Master of Arts degree from Salford University. In April, she starred in two-part psychological thriller The Cry, which she described as her "most naked role yet". She played a social worker grieving her second still-born child who is determined to protect a baby she perceives to be at risk of abuse. Lancashire drew on her own experiences of clinical depression in her depiction of her character's mentality. Her performance saw her awarded with a Golden Nymph award for Best Performance by an Actress in a Mini-Series at the Monte-Carlo Television Festival. In April, it was reported that Lancashire had been lined up to play the lead role in comedy drama Life Begins, which creator Mike Bullen had written with Lancashire in mind. However, by June, Lancashire had exited the drama, unwilling to commit to a potentially long running series. Later that month, BBC News and newspaper The Guardian reported that Lancashire had exited her exclusive deal with ITV, which would not be renewed after it expired in the autumn. The decision was reportedly influenced by Lancashire's desire to reduce her workload and to have the freedom to take on other roles. In September 2002, she began appearing in an 11 episode, three season crime drama, Rose and Maloney, as legal investigator Rose Linden. On 22 December she appeared in the television movie Birthday Girl as Rachel Jones, who plans a party to celebrate being in remission from a serious illness, only to discover that the disease has returned.

Lancashire's final role under her ITV contract was Gertrude Morel in an adaptation of D.H. Lawrence's 1913 novel Sons and Lovers, airing in January 2003. The portrayal –her first of a mother with adult children– followed Gertrude's transformation from a young bride into a fifty-something woman ravaged by her life experiences of poverty and domestic abuse. Lancashire re-read the novel several times prior to filming, and identified with the themes of filial and marital relationships she had been unable to appreciate as a GCSE student. The miniseries gave her a sense of conviction in her career path, stating ahead of the broadcast in 2002: "whatever the reason I do what I do, I felt I had come to a point where I could stop searching after this". Reviewing the serial, Paul Hoggart of The Times wrote that Lancashire "steals the show" with a "performance of immense subtlety and quiet strength, proof, if we still needed it, that she has matured into a terrific actress." Conversely Andrew Billen, writing in New Statesman, wrote that "Sarah Lancashire was no revelation at all", purely because she had "long since proved herself a formidable actress".

=== 2004–2012: Subsequent projects ===
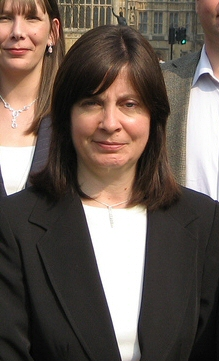
Lancashire portrayed Angela Cannings (pictured) in the 2005 television film Cherished, a dramatisation of the activist's bereavement and subsequent wrongful imprisonment.

While pregnant with her third child, Lancashire began an 18-month career break, the longest of her working life. Lancashire's first job after returning to work was her directorial debut on an episode of the BBC One anthology series The Afternoon Play. For "Viva Las Blackpool", she was given the Best Newcomer Award (sponsored by BBC Birmingham) at the Birmingham Screen Festival and the Best New Talent Award at the Royal Television Society (Midlands) awards in 2004. The venture also earned her first British Academy Television Awards nomination in 2005 for Best new Director of Fiction. Lancashire next filmed three two-part stories for Rose and Maloney, following on from the pilot episode in 2002. The delay between shooting for the pilot and its follow-up was a result of Lancashire's career break and problems reconciling her availability with that of co-star Phil Davis.

In 2005, Lancashire starred in The Rotters' Club as a housewife in 1970s Birmingham. Also in 2005, she appeared in the BBC television film Cherished as Angela Cannings, a British woman who was wrongfully convicted of killing her two baby sons. Lancashire was proud to be involved with the project, having greatly admired Cannings' strength of character during her ordeal, and being able to relate to her sense of anguish as a parent. In December 2005, Lancashire returned to West End theatre, taking on the role of Miss Adelaide in the Donmar Warehouse production of Guys and Dolls at the Piccadilly Theatre. Lancashire was due to stay with the production until March 2006, but due to a severe chest infection made her last appearance on 4 January.

In 2006, Lancashire accepted an invitation to write a short autobiographical entry in Who's Who. Lancashire's only television acting role in 2006 was as house-wife and cake-maker Elaine in the BBC comedy drama Angel Cake. In November, she presented an episode of the Five documentary series Disappearing Britain in which she interviewed people with memories of Wakes Week holidays in Blackpool during the early 20th century. In February 2007, she made an appearance in the E4 teen drama series Skins. This was followed by a leading role in the BBC Two television drama Sex, the City and Me as solicitor Ruth Gilbert. In October, Lancashire appeared in her first feature film, David Nicholls' And When Did You Last See Your Father? in which she played aunt Beaty. In December, she played the supporting role of Mrs Corney in the BBC's 2007 adaptation of Charles Dickens' 1838 novel Oliver Twist. Whilst ambivalent about the serial as a whole, The Daily Mirror's Jane Simon singled Lancashire out for praise stating that she "really sets the tone for the cold, unfeeling world into which orphaned Oliver is born."

Between 2008 and 2011, Lancashire narrated the BBC One series Lark Rise to Candleford, a costume drama based on Flora Thompson's memoir of her Oxfordshire childhood in the 1880s. In April, she appeared in the opening episode of the 2008 series of Doctor Who, as "an enigmatic and powerful businesswoman" who Lancashire described as a "warped Mary Poppins". She was amongst a number of high-profile actors the series' executive producer Russell T Davies secured for the fourth series of the science-fiction drama as part of his intention to make it "bigger and blowsier". In 2009, Lancashire starred in the BBC One musical drama series All the Small Things. She played Esther Caddick, a full-time mother who starts a choir after her husband leaves her for a more glamorous woman. In July that year, the actress was made an honorary Doctor of Letters by the University of Huddersfield.

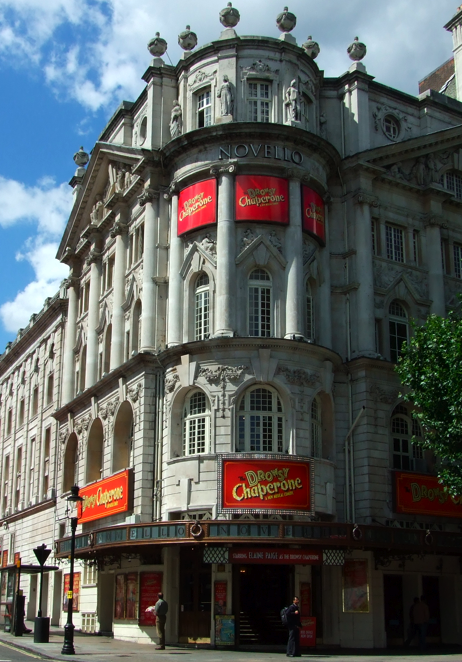
The Novello Theatre, where Lancashire originated the role of Joyce Chilvers in Betty Blue Eyes in 2011.

Following this, she reunited with director Coky Giedroyc, who had directed her in Oliver Twist, for a 2009 television adaptation of Emily Brontë's 1847 novel Wuthering Heights in which she played housekeeper Nelly Dean. In 2010, Lancashire portrayed Rosemary Nicholls, mother of a murder victim, in the three-part BBC drama Five Daughters; a depiction of the Ipswich serial murders from the perspective of the victims and their families. Though the pair never met, Lancashire felt it important to receive Nicholls' consent before filming, and was later "humbled" and "relieved" to receive a feedback letter thanking her for her portrayal. Also in 2010, she guest-starred in the police drama series Inspector George Gently.

In March 2011, Lancashire began starring in a new Cameron Mackintosh musical, Betty Blue Eyes, at the Novello Theatre. In the production, a loose adaptation of the 1984 film A Private Function, she starred as Joyce Chilvers, an aspirational housewife whom Lancashire described as "brittle" and "capricious". Despite positive reviews the musical closed in London on 24 September 2011, after a run of just six months. For her performance Lancashire was nominated for the Laurence Olivier Award for Best Actress in a Musical. In 2012, she appeared as lady's maid Miss Whisset in the penultimate episode of the 2010 revival of Upstairs Downstairs. In September 2012, Lancashire began appearing as Head of Ladieswear Miss Audrey in the six-part series The Paradise set in a department store in Northern England in the late 19th century. Lancashire described her character as "a true archetypal spinster" who has long denied herself a romantic life and who begins to feel undermined by a younger colleague.

=== 2012–present: Last Tango in Halifax, Happy Valley and recent work ===
Between November 2012 and March 2020, Lancashire appeared opposite Anne Reid and Derek Jacobi in the BBC drama series Last Tango in Halifax. In the series, she plays Caroline, an Oxford-educated headmistress who feels that her mother's second marriage gives her "permission" to be herself. Caroline's same-sex relationship with a fellow teacher resulted in Lancashire receiving more fan mail than for any other role, largely from women telling her that the series had helped them to come out. Due to the under-representation of gay characters in television, Lancashire felt it particularly important that Caroline's experience would be depicted accurately. In her portrayal, she opted to focus on the "humanity" of the character, rather than her sexuality. Filming of the second series clashed with filming of the second series of The Paradise, which necessitated Lancashire leaving The Paradise partway through its second series. For her role as Caroline, she was nominated for the British Academy Television Award for Best Supporting Actress in both 2013 and 2014, winning in 2014. At the 2015 Hay Festival, Lancashire stated that of all the roles she has taken on in her career Caroline is the one she is most proud of, citing the "extraordinary impact" of the character. After airing three full series, Last Tango in Halifax returned for a fourth series in December 2016, consisting of two episodes which were promoted as "Christmas Specials", and also for a fifth series in 2020.

In 2014, Lancashire re-united with Last Tango in Halifax writer Sally Wainwright on the crime drama Happy Valley. Wainwright was keen to write another role for Lancashire after being "blown away" by her performances in Last Tango in Halifax. Lancashire portrays single-grandparent Catherine Cawood, a police sergeant still dealing with the aftermath of her daughter's rape, and subsequent suicide, eight years earlier. Mark Lawson of The Guardian identified the performance as a career best for Lancashire, stating that she perfectly conveyed "the script's demandingly contradictory notes of tragedy, comedy, love, guilt, weakness and courage". For this role she earned the TV Choice Award for Best Actress in 2014, and the Royal Television Programme Award for Best Actress in 2015. In September 2014, the Radio Times listed her as one of the thirty most powerful women in British television and radio. In April 2015, she received her fourth BAFTA television nomination, her first in the Best Actress category. In June 2015, she was named Best Actress in a Drama Series at the Monte Carlo Television Festival.

Despite Lancashire's concerns regarding the decision to extend the story told in Happy Valley, Wainwright's "genuine" storytelling and "integrity" convinced her to return for a second series, which aired in 2016. Lancashire stated that she found the second series as "emotionally brutal" as the first; disclosing to The Independent that she inhabited Catherine's emotional pain for the entirety of the shoot. Whilst promoting the second series, Lancashire also refuted criticism about the level of violence towards women in the series, stating she "would never condone anything which [she] thought was salacious, titillating, or gratuitous" and that Catherine's experience represented an "absolutely honest portrayal of what a female police officer can be subjected to". For her role in the second series of Happy Valley, Lancashire won the 2017 National Television Award for Best Dramatic Performance, and the BAFTA TV award for Best Actress.

In March 2015, Lancashire began filming a television adaptation of Ronald Harwood's 1980 play The Dresser. In the drama, which aired in October 2015, Lancashire portrayed stage manager Madge, whose unrequited love for 'Sir' (Anthony Hopkins), the head of a repertory theatre company, puts her at odds with his dresser and confidant, Norman (Ian McKellen). Lancashire described The Dresser as "the greatest piece ever written about actors" and found both working with and observing McKellen and Hopkins – "two of the greatest actors ever" – an extraordinary experience. Following an airing on the American premium cable channel Starz in 2016, Lancashire was nominated for the 2016 Critics' Choice Television Award for Best Supporting Actress in a Movie or Miniseries Lancashire played Mrs Pike in the 2016 feature film Dad's Army, based on the situation comedy series of the same name. In early 2017, she began voicing the character of "Headmonstress" Mrs Twirlyhorn in the animated pre-school series School of Roars, which airs on Cbeebies.

Lancashire was due to appear opposite Martin Freeman in Labour of Love, a political comedy by James Graham, at the Noël Coward Theatre in late 2017 but pulled out on 1 September "on doctor's advice" and was replaced by Tamsin Greig. In 2018, she starred as Miriam – billed as an "experienced, no-nonsense social worker" – in Kiri, a four-part drama series written by Jack Thorne, co-produced by Channel 4 and the American on-demand service Hulu. The miniseries centres on a black girl living with a white foster couple who is murdered on a visit to her family, putting Miriam and the social services under scrutiny.

Lancashire portrayed Julia Child in the HBO Max drama Julia. The eight-part series debuted on the channel in March 2022. Having received favourable reviews, the series was renewed in May 2022. In October 2023, it was announced she would be co-starring in the 2024 Netflix series Black Doves.

== Personal life ==
In 1987, at the age of 22, Lancashire married her first serious boyfriend, Gary Hargreaves, a music lecturer 11 years her senior, whom she had met four years earlier. In 2001, recalling the circumstances of her first marriage, Lancashire stated she had only married because she had become pregnant and possessed both a traditional outlook and a fear of the stigma of having a child out of wedlock. Her first child with Hargreaves was born in 1987; a second son was born in 1989.

Two years into her role on Coronation Street, Lancashire experienced a 14-month nervous breakdown, but did not confide in anyone besides her close family or take any time off work. In retrospect, she deemed her decision "the worst thing [she] could have done". During the worst part of her experience, Lancashire described herself as "hysterical at the thought of getting out of bed". Her mother, Hilda, forced her to seek medical assistance for her condition, which Lancashire states "gave me my life back", her twenties having been "a write-off".

Lancashire felt her first marriage, from 1987 to 1997, had also contributed to her unhappiness; she later stated, in 2001, that though her marriage lasted ten years it "was 10 years longer than it should have done". In 1995, she separated from Hargreaves; the couple would divorce two years later. She described leaving her marriage as a "cleansing experience" and a "renaissance"; one that enabled her to rediscover her sense of identity. Other steps that Lancashire took to combat her depression included remaining single for five years, attending therapy sessions and taking the anti-depressant drug paroxetine.

In August 2001, Lancashire married television executive Peter Salmon in a low-key ceremony held at Langar Hall, Nottinghamshire. Salmon had proposed to Lancashire in New York during a holiday at Easter 2001. The two had begun a romantic relationship in the summer of 2000, though they had first met several years earlier while she was portraying Raquel on Coronation Street and he was employed by Granada Studios, which produces the soap opera. In March 2003, Lancashire gave birth to her third son.

== Awards and nominations ==
Lancashire was appointed Officer of the Order of the British Empire (OBE) in the 2017 Birthday Honours and Commander of the Order of the British Empire (CBE) in the 2025 New Year Honours, both for services to drama.
