= Jacqueline Defferary =

British actress (born 1968)

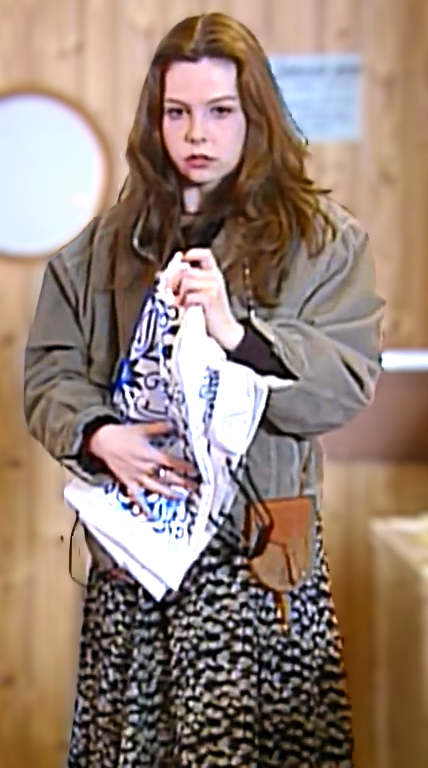
- Defferary in "Tee Off, Mr. Bean" (1995)
- Born: October 1968 (age 57–58)
- Occupation: Actress
- Years active: 1991–present
- Spouse: Alasdair Craig

Jacqueline Defferary (born October 1968) is a British actress. She is married to actor Alasdair Craig.

== Career ==
=== Film and television ===
Defferary's first screen role was in 1992 as Daisy in The Ruth Rendell Mysteries serial "Kissing the Gunner's Daughter". She has also appeared in several episodes of ITV police drama The Bill.

In 1995 she appeared in two sitcoms starring Rowan Atkinson. In the Mr. Bean episode "Tee Off, Mr. Bean", she played a woman in a launderette, and in The Thin Blue Line episode titled "Yuletide Spirit", she played a homeless woman.

The same year she was in an episode of the Gerry Anderson television series Space Precinct as Lynn/Srprite. In 1997 she appeared as Julie (7 episodes) in the short-lived BBC sitcom A Perfect State.

In 1997 she had a role in Cadfael (Season 3, Episode 2, "St Peter's Fair") as Emma Vernold, and also played "Cicely" in the comedy sketch "Look Listen & Take Heed – Women Keep Your Virtue" on Harry Enfield and Chums.

She originated the role of Sally in the stage play Cleo, Camping, Emmanuelle and Dick (based on the Carry On series of films), and played the role again in 2000 for its television adaptation, renamed Cor, Blimey!.

In 2001 she starred in the Urban Gothic episode "The End" as Lucy Morgan. 2006 saw her feature in Elizabeth David: A Life in Recipes. In 2009 she appeared as Mrs Taylor in four episodes of the BBC One soap opera EastEnders.

In 2014 she appeared in Agatha Christie: Ordeal By Innocence (TV Mini-Series) as Glenda.

In 2018 she appeared in Father Brown "The Devil You Know" (Series 6 Episode 6) as Shirley Krieger.

Her film credits include Red Mercury (Amanda), Pandaemonium (Miss Holland) and I'll Sleep When I'm Dead (Annie, waitress).

=== Theatre ===
As well as screen roles, Defferary has also starred in a number of theatrical productions including The Rivals and The Comedy of Errors, both for the Royal Shakespeare Company. And for the Royal National Theatre she has appeared in Welcome to Thebes and Cleo, Camping, Emmanuelle and Dick among others.

At the Royal Court Theatre she starred in The Arsonists, and Push Up alongside David Tennant.
