= Telltale (TV series) =

Welsh television series

- Genre: Crime drama
- Written by: Ewart Alexander
- Directed by: Dewi Humphreys
- Starring: Bernard Hill; Nigel Harrison; Robert Pugh; Rachel Davies
- Composer: Mark Thomas
- Country of origin: United Kingdom
- Original language: English
- No. of series: 1
- No. of episodes: 3

Production
- Executive producer: Alan Clayton
- Producer: Manny Wessels
- Running time: 51 minutes (including adverts)
- Production company: HTV Wales

Original release
- Network: ITV
- Release: 10 June – 24 June 1993

Telltale is a three-part television crime drama series set in South Wales, this series was produced by HTV Wales for the ITV Network, first aired on ITV from 10 to 24 June 1993. The drama stars Bernard Hill, Nigel Harrison, Robert Pugh and Rachel Davies, and involves an opportunist criminal puts his and his family's lives in grave danger when he turns supergrass.

== Cast ==
- Bernard Hill as DS Gavin Douglas
- Nigel Harrison as DS Paul Herbert
- Robert Pugh as Billy Hodge
- Rachel Davies as Doreen Hodge
- Beth Morris as Rosie Douglas
- Melanie Walters as Jean Herbert

== Episodes ==
No.	Title	Directed by	Written by	Original release date
1	"Episode 1"	Dewi Humphreys	Ewart Alexander	10 June 1993
Habitual criminal Billy Hodge and his wife Doreen are attacked in their home by a gang of rival thugs. Billy agrees to become a 'supergrass' on condition that Doreen is looked after in a safe house, but DS Gavin Douglas is suspicious of Billy.
2	"Episode 2"	Dewi Humphreys	Ewart Alexander	17 June 1993
Billy Hodge starts his career as a supergrass, and Detectives Gavin Douglas and Paul Herbert are caught between the devil and the deep blue sea when they find themselves at Billy and his wife, Doreen are at mercy.
3	"Episode 3"	Dewi Humphreys	Ewart Alexander	24 June 1993
As the first trial approaches, but fortunately, Gavin and Paul's expectations are at an all-time high.
