= Get Real (British TV series) =

- Genre: Sitcom
- Created by: Alan Davies; Paul Waites
- Directed by: Dewi Humphreys
- Starring: Lindsay Duncan; Simon Godley; Lloyd Owen; Lesley Vickerage
- Country of origin: United Kingdom
- Original language: English
- No. of series: 1
- No. of episodes: 7

Production
- Executive producers: Mick Pilsworth; Nick Symons
- Producer: Sue Birbeck
- Running time: 30 minutes (including adverts)
- Production companies: Tandem Television for Carlton; in association with Red Rooster Film & Television Entertainment

Original release
- Network: ITV
- Release: 6 July – 17 August 1998

Get Real! is a 1998 British sitcom. It starred Lindsay Duncan, Simon Godley, Lloyd Owen and Lesley Vickerage.

It was made by Tandem Television and Carlton Television (developed in association with Red Rooster Film & Television Entertainment) for the ITV network.

== Plot ==
Louise (Duncan), Adam (Owen), Lestor (Godley) and Francine (Vickerage) are four Londoners in their late 20s or early 30s (although Duncan was 48 at the time of filming), all living in Ladbroke Grove. They are constantly meeting up in each other's flats or in a nearby coffee bar to drink and discuss life, love and sex (possibly due to some of the subject matter being dealt with, the series was broadcast in a post-News at Ten slot).

Adam was the smart, cool one; Louise his glamorous friend and landlady; Lestor, his nerdish best friend; and Francine his latest girlfriend, a newcomer to the bunch who – lacking confidence with new people – was finding it hard to fit in. Furthermore, Adam and Louise had enjoyed a brief fling in the past and there was still an attraction between them. Due to the status of the characters as young, metropolitan singles, as well as the nature of the characters themselves and the contemporary urban setting in which they are set, the show could be seen as an attempt to be a British equivalent to the more famous American sitcoms from around the same time that followed this trend, such as Friends or Seinfeld.

Unfortunately, one of the reasons that it was not deemed a big success was that many television critics who watched it could not help comparing them with the like of Friends, Frasier or Seinfeld, particularly in the first few episodes. They condemned it as a poor attempt to imitate that type of American sitcom, and hence ITV cancelled it after its only series of seven episodes. However, according to Mark Lewisohn in the Radio Times Guide to TV Comedy:

This was a pity because, by the end, Get Real! had improved immensely. Latter episodes were witty and sexy, and the plots started to shape up nicely. But ITV seemed unwilling to give the series time to mature and that was the end of the matter.

== Episodes ==
- 1. Part of the Furniture (6 July 1998)
- 2. Secrets (13 July 1998)
- 3. Patches (20 July 1998)
- 4. Parking (27 July 1998)
- 5. Funny Guy (3 August 1998)
- 6. Leg (10 August 1998)
- 7. Hero (17 August 1998)
