= Robin Shepperd =

British television director

Robin Sheppard (sometimes credited as Robin Shepperd) is a British television director who has directed Lucky Jim (2003), Octavia, Cherished (2005), The Bad Mother's Handbook, and episodes of Kingdom, Casualty, Playing the Field, New Tricks and At Home with the Braithwaites. She was jointly nominated for a British Academy Television Award in 1998 for her work on Wing and a Prayer, and Cherished won the Best Drama Documentary Grierson Award in 2005. Shepperd will be directing the 2010 episodic video game, Venus Redemption. Shepperd is currently attached to Apples, a 2012 film adaptation of Richard Milward's 2007 book of the same name.
