= A Perfect State =

British TV comedy series

- Directed by: Dewi Humphreys
- Starring: Gwen Taylor; Richard Hope; Trevor Cooper; Emma Amos; Danny Webb; Jacqueline Defferary
- Country of origin: United Kingdom
- Original language: English
- No. of series: 1
- No. of episodes: 7

Production
- Executive producers: Verity Lambert; Geoffrey Perkins
- Producer: Sharon Bloom
- Running time: 30 minutes

Original release
- Network: BBC1
- Release: 27 February – 13 April 1997

A Perfect State is a 1997 British sitcom starring Gwen Taylor, Richard Hope, Trevor Cooper, Emma Amos and Danny Webb. It debuted on BBC1 on Thursday 27 February 1997 and ran for seven episodes.

Taylor took the leading role of Laura Fitzgerald, the Deputy Mayor of Flatby, a town on the East Coast of England. As the series begins, she is informed that because Flatby was never surveyed for the Domesday Book, it has never officially been annexed into the United Kingdom. As a result, and much to the chagrin of the Government in London, Laura rallies the townsfolk to declare Flatby an independent state.

Most of the filming was carried out in Wivenhoe in Essex.

== Cast ==
- Gwen Taylor as Laura Fitzgerald
- Richard Hope as Simon
- Trevor Cooper as Bert
- Emma Amos as Deirdre
- Danny Webb as Johnny
- Jacqueline Defferary as Julie
- Rudolph Walker as Winston
- Alan David as Gareth
- Matthew Cottle as Malcolm

== Episodes ==
No.	Title	Original release date
1	"A Declaration of Independence"	27 February 1997
2	"Border Post"	6 March 1997
3	"Financial Crisis"	13 March 1997
4	"Power Cut"	20 March 1997
5	"Dodgy Money"	27 March 1997
6	"Police Force"	6 April 1997
7	"National Anthem"	13 April 1997
