= Betty Blue Eyes =

2011 Musical

- Original West End production
- Music: George Stiles
- Lyrics: Anthony Drewe
- Book: Ron Cowen; Daniel Lipman
- Basis: A Private Function by Alan Bennett and Malcolm Mowbray
- Premiere: 19 March 2011: Novello Theatre
- Productions: 2011 West End; 2013 Wichita; 2018 Linz, Austria; 2023 Union Theatre / 1st London Revival; 2026 Hobart College

Betty Blue Eyes is a 2011 stage musical comedy based on the 1984 film A Private Function, and features music by George Stiles, with lyrics by Anthony Drewe. The book was written for the stage by Ron Cowen and Daniel Lipman, adapted from Alan Bennett's original screenplay.

== Background ==
Betty Blue Eyes is based on the 1984 film A Private Function, by Alan Bennett. The show marked producer Cameron Mackintosh's first new musical in over 10 years and when describing what drew him to the project (which he has described as "delicious"), Mackintosh said:

"The score was written by friends of mine, George Stiles and Anthony Drewe, whom I've known for 25 years and [who,] of course, did all the terrific new songs for Mary Poppins ... The book was written by two Americans [Cowen and Lipman], and it was their idea... I read it and I thought it was the most original piece I had read in a long, long time. I mean, I knew they were working on it, because the moment I heard it was a musical version of A Private Function — a film I loved, by Alan Bennett, which was very, very funny and off-the-wall — I was intrigued..."

== Production history ==
=== Original London production (2011) ===
Betty Blue Eyes opened at the Novello Theatre in the West End, London, on 13 April 2011, following previews from 19 March. The production was directed by Richard Eyre, with musical staging by Stephen Mear design by Tim Hatley and orchestrations by William David Brohn. The cast consisted of Sarah Lancashire as Joyce Chilvers, Reece Shearsmith as Gilbert Chilvers, David Bamber as Doctor Swaby, Jack Edwards as Mr Allardyce, Ann Emery as Mother Dear, Mark Meadows as Lockwood and Adrian Scarborough as Inspector Wormold. The voice of the show's animatronic pig Betty was provided by Australian singer Kylie Minogue. Despite positive reviews, the musical closed in London on 24 September 2011, after a run of six months.

=== Other productions ===
The first production outside the UK and the shows American premiere took place at Music Theatre of Wichita in Wichita, Kansas from 24 to 28 July 2013. Music Theatre of Wichita previously recorded the North American cast album for George Stiles and Anthony Drewe's musical Honk!. The production was directed by Wayne Bryan and featured Justin Robertson, Larry Raben, Tracy Lore, and Mary Stout.

In March 2014, a new production, directed by Daniel Buckroyd, opened at the Mercury Theatre, Colchester ahead of a UK Tour in a co-production between the Mercury Theatre Colchester, Liverpool Everyman & Playhouse, Salisbury Playhouse and West Yorkshire Playhouse. In February 2018, the first German-speaking production, directed by Christian Brey, opened at Musiktheater Linz, Austria under the title Betty Blue Eyes - Das Musical mit dem Schwein. The German translation is provided by Roman Hinze.

In March 2023, the first London fringe revival, directed by Sasha Regan, opened at the Union Theatre, London. The production had choreography by Kasper Cornish, musical direction by Aaron Clingham, set & costume design by Reuben Speed, lighting design by Alistair Lindsay, assistant direction by Michael Mather, assistant design by David Spence, stage management by Jack Evans, casting by Adam Braham and production by The Union Theatre & By The Sea Productions.

== Music ==
=== Musical numbers ===
Act I

- Overture (Austerity Britain) — The Orchestra
- "Fair Shares for All" — Joyce, The Company
- "A Place on the Parade" — Gilbert, Joyce
- "Magic Fingers" — Gilbert, Mrs Roach, Mrs Lester, Mrs Turnbull
- "Magic Fingers" (Reprise) — Mrs Metcalf, Gilbert
- "Painting by Heart" — Wormold, The Company
- "Nobody" — Joyce, The Company
- "A Private Function" — Swaby, Allardyce, Lockwood
- "Betty Blue Eyes" — Allardyce, Gilbert
- "The Riot" — Wormold, Noble, The Company
- "Lionheart" — Joyce, The Billy Carroll Trio, The Company
- "Steal the Pig" — Gilbert, Joyce, Swaby, Allardyce, Lockwood, Wormold, The Company

Act II

- Entr'acte (The Pignap) — The Orchestra
- "Another Little Victory" — Gilbert, Joyce, The Company
- "Kill the Pig" (Reprise) — Joyce
- "It's an Ill Wind" — Mrs Tilbrook, Townswomen
- "Pig No Pig" — Joyce, Gilbert, Mother Dear, Wormold, Veronica
- "The Kind of Man I Am" — Gilbert
- "Since The War" — Swaby, Allardyce, Lockwood, Noble
- "Betty Blue Eyes" (Reprise) — Gilbert, Allardyce
- "A Private Function" (Reprise) — The Company
- "Finale Ultimo" - Confessions — The Company
- "Magic Fingers" (Reprise) — Gilbert, Joyce
- "Goodbye Austerity Britain" — The Company

=== Cast album ===
Featuring 20 songs on the physical CD with an additional two bonus tracks available as digital downloads only from the London production of Betty Blue Eyes, the cast album was released by First Night Records on 3 October 2011. The recording was made at the Novello Theatre over five performances.

Betty Blue Eyes (Original London Cast Recording)

Soundtrack album cast recording by Various
- Released: 3 October 2011
- Length: 79:38
- Label: First Night Records

| No. | Title | Length |
|---|---|---|
| 1. | "Overture - Austerity Britain" | 1:58 |
| 2. | "Fair Shares for All" | 3:42 |
| 3. | "A Place on the Parade" | 3:46 |
| 4. | "Magic Fingers" | 4:37 |
| 5. | "Painting By Heart" | 5:07 |
| 6. | "Nobody" | 3:14 |
| 7. | "Nobody Part 2" | 2:42 |
| 8. | "A Private Function" | 2:59 |
| 9. | "Betty Blue Eyes" | 3:59 |
| 10. | "Lionheart" | 5:06 |
| 11. | "Steal the Pig" | 4:59 |
| 12. | "Another Little Victory" | 4:50 |
| 13. | "It's an Ill Wind" | 3:00 |
| 14. | "Pig no Pig" | 6:53 |
| 15. | "The Kind of Man I am" | 3:25 |
| 16. | "Since The War (Bonus Track)" | 3:03 |
| 17. | "A Private Function (Reprise)" | 1:40 |
| 18. | "Finale Ultimo - Confessions" | 8:18 |
| 19. | "Magic Fingers (Reprise)" | 2:18 |
| 20. | "Betty Blue Eyes (Reprise)" | 1:29 |
| 21. | "Jitterbug" | 1:36 |
| 22. | "Magic Fingers (Bonus Track)" | 5:37 |

== Principal roles and cast members ==
| Characters | London | London revival |
| Characters | 2011 | 2023 |
|---|---|---|
| Joyce Chilvers | Sarah Lancashire | Amelia Atherton |
| Gilbert Chilvers | Reece Shearsmith | Sam Kipling |
| Mother Dear | Ann Emery | Jayne Ashley |
| Inspector Wormold | Adrian Scarborough | David Pendlebury |
| Dr James Swaby | David Bamber | Stuart Simons |
| Henry Allardyce | Jack Edwards | Josh Perry |
| Francis Lockwood | Mark Meadows | Tom Holt |
| Betty (Puppet) | | Georgia Bootham |
| Betty (Voice) | Kylie Minogue | |
| Mr Noble / Sutcliffe | | George Dawes |
| Mrs Lester | | Jade Marvin |
| Mrs Turnbull | | Katie Stasi |
| Mrs Allardyce | | Laurel Douglas |
| Mrs Metcalf | | Aimée McQueen |
| Mrs Lockwood | | Shannon Farrell |
| Vera Bowen | | Hannah Lawton |
| Mr Metcalf | | Kane Stone |
| Mr Nuttall | | Jonny Weston |
| Mrs Roach | | Emma Jane Fearnley |
| Veronica Allardyce | | Nellie Regan Ava Jennings-Grant Coco Bennett |

== Awards and nominations ==
=== Original London production ===
| Year | Award | Category | Nominee | Result |
|---|---|---|---|---|
| 2012 | Laurence Olivier Award | Best New Musical | | Nominated |
| 2012 | Laurence Olivier Award | Best Actor in a Musical | Reece Shearsmith | Nominated |
| 2012 | Laurence Olivier Award | Best Actress in a Musical | Sarah Lancashire | Nominated |
| 2012 | Whatsonstage.com Awards | Best New Musical | | Nominated |
| 2012 | Whatsonstage.com Awards | Best Actor in a Musical | Reece Shearsmith | Nominated |
| 2012 | Whatsonstage.com Awards | Best Actress in a Musical | Sarah Lancashire | Nominated |
| 2012 | Whatsonstage.com Awards | Best Supporting Actress in a Musical | Ann Emery | Nominated |
| 2012 | Whatsonstage.com Awards | Best Lighting Designer | Neil Austin | Nominated |
