= A Private Function =

1984 British comedy film

- Theatrical release poster
- Directed by: Malcolm Mowbray
- Written by: Alan Bennett; Malcolm Mowbray
- Produced by: George Harrison; Denis O'Brien; Mark Shivas
- Starring: Michael Palin; Maggie Smith; Denholm Elliott; Richard Griffiths; Tony Haygarth; Bill Paterson; John Normington; Liz Smith; Alison Steadman
- Cinematography: Tony Pierce-Roberts
- Edited by: Barrie Vince
- Music by: John Du Prez
- Production company: HandMade Films
- Release date: November 9, 1984 (United Kingdom)
- Running time: 94 minutes
- Country: United Kingdom
- Language: English
- Budget: £1.2 million
- Box office: $2,527,088

A Private Function is a 1984 British comedy film starring Michael Palin and Maggie Smith. The film was predominantly filmed in Ilkley and Ben Rhydding in West Yorkshire. The film was also screened in the section of Un Certain Regard at the 1985 Cannes Film Festival.

== Synopsis ==
In a small town in Northern England in 1947, the citizens endure continuing food rationing, resulting from World War II. Some local businessmen plan a party to celebrate the royal Wedding of Princess Elizabeth to Prince Philip and decide to illegally raise an unregistered pig for that occasion. However, the pig is stolen by chiropodist Gilbert Chilvers, who was encouraged to do so by his domineering and snobbish wife Joyce. Meanwhile, the local food inspector is determined to stop activities circumventing the food rationing.

== Cast ==
- Michael Palin as Gilbert Chilvers
- Maggie Smith as Joyce Chilvers
- Denholm Elliott as Dr. Swaby
- Richard Griffiths as Allardyce
- Tony Haygarth as Sutcliff
- John Normington as Lockwood
- Bill Paterson as Wormold
- Liz Smith as Mother
- Alison Steadman as Mrs Allardyce
- Jim Carter as Inspector Noble
- Pete Postlethwaite as Nuttal
- Reece Dinsdale as P.C. Penny
- Don Estelle as Barraclough, the butcher
- Rachel Davies as Mrs Forbes, Wormold's landlady

Producer George Harrison made an uncredited voice cameo.

== Production ==
The film was based on an idea by director Malcolm Mowbray, who had worked with Alan Bennett on Our Winnie. Mowbray suggested they make a film set during the time of post-war rationining.

In July 1983 Alan Bennett and Malcolm Mowbray offered the lead role to Michael Palin. Palin wrote in his diary, "Slightly disappointed that the part of Gilbert Chilvers is not a) bigger, b) more difficult or different from things I’ve done. But he does have his moments and it’s a very funny and well observed period piece." Palin later wrote that "I've decided over the weekend not to do it" despite Maggie Smith being attached. However by August he agreed. Finance was raised from HandMade Films.

At one stage the film was known as Pork Royale.

Filming started in April 1984. Most of the film was shot in Ilkley and Barnoldswick.

Three pigs were used in the filming of A Private Function which were all named Betty. Producer Mark Shivas was advised by Intellectual Animals UK that the pigs used should be female and six months old so as to not be too large or aggressive. However, the pigs were "unpredictable and often quite dangerous".

During filming of one of the kitchen scenes, Maggie Smith was hemmed in by one of the pigs and needed to vault over the back of it in order to escape.

== Release ==
The film had a Royal charity premiere on 21 November 1984 before being screened at the London Film Festival on 22 November and opening at the Odeon Haymarket in London on 30 November.

== Reception ==
For Michael Brooke at BFI Screenonline, the film is possibly "the closest that 1980s British cinema came to recapturing the spirit of the great Ealing comedies". He noted "something Kafkaesque about this" film (Bennett wrote his play Kafka's Dick shortly after). He commended the "uniformly superb" cast but concluded that "the real star is Bennett's script, bristling with funny, poignant one-liners [...] and absurd yet strangely convincing situations".

On Sneak Previews in 1985, both Gene Siskel and Roger Ebert gave the movie two thumbs up. They called it one "really funny movie" and one "flat out winner." Siskel said it "had perfectly believable characters" and Ebert said "just beneath this veneer of respectability is utter madness."

=== Box office ===
The film made £1,560,000 in the UK.

== Awards ==
The film won three BAFTA Film Awards: Best Actress for Maggie Smith, Best Supporting Actress for Liz Smith, and Best Supporting Actor for Denholm Elliott. It was also nominated for Best Original Screenplay (Alan Bennett) and Best Film.

== Musical adaptation ==
A musical based on the film opened in the West End in April 2011 under the new title Betty Blue Eyes. It was produced by Cameron Mackintosh and ran for several months at the Novello Theatre. It starred Reece Shearsmith as Gilbert and Sarah Lancashire as Joyce.

== Notes ==
- Palin, Michael (2009). Halfway to Hollywood : diaries 1980 to 1988. Weidenfeld & Nicolson.
