= Sandmann =

Sandmann is a surname. Notable people with the surname include:

- Christoph Sandmann (1967), German equestrian
- Gertrude Sandmann (1893–1981), German artist and Holocaust survivor
- Helmut Sandmann (1944), retired German football player
- Jan Sandmann (1978), German former football player
