= The Sandman (novel) =

1984 novel by Miles Gibson

- First edition
- Author: Miles Gibson
- Language: English
- English publication date: 1984
- ISBN: 9780571299805
- Website: http://www.milesgibson.com/

The Sandman is the first novel by English writer Miles Gibson.

The book was originally published by Heinemann in 1984.

== Plot ==
The book records the life and times of a good-natured serial killer (William "Mackerel" Burton), who murders for the fun of it.

== Reception ==
Dean Sims wrote "In this day of so much crime and violence, such fiction is a terrible waste - perhaps even a reservoir of sadistic ideas for warpies looking for them."
