= Mark Meadows (actor) =

British actor

Mark Meadows is a British television and radio actor. Meadows has appeared in Lost Souls and The Worst Journey in the World, both first broadcast in 2008 and directed by Kate McAll for BBC Radio 4. For television, Meadows appeared as 'Reverend Wallace' in an episode of the BBC soap opera EastEnders on 29 July 2010.
