= Kingdom Swann =

1990 novel by Miles Gibson

- First edition
- Author: Miles Gibson
- Language: English
- Publication date: 1990

Kingdom Swann is an historical novel by the reclusive English writer Miles Gibson, his fourth book. It was first published in 1990 by William Heinemann, followed by a paperback edition published by Black Swan in 1991 and subsequently reprinted by the Do-Not Press in 1998.

The novel is a rambunctious satire on the dangerously thin line between art and pornography, fact and fantasy. The protagonist, Kingdom Swann (1825–1916), is a late Victorian painter of classical nudes on an epic scale who, turning to the newfangled invention of the photographic camera to capture his subjects, finds himself recording the erotic fantasies of a generation. "As in Daniel Defoe's Roxana: The Fortunate Mistress, a voyeuristic fascination plays games with high morality," reported Sabine Durrant in The Times. The novel was adapted by David Nobbs as a feature-length drama called Gentlemen's Relish for the BBC in 2001, starring Billy Connolly, Sarah Lancashire, and Douglas Henshall.
