= Wales Playhouse =

1990–1996 Welsh television series

Wales Playhouse is a 30-minute UK dramatic anthology series produced by and airing on BBC Wales. Twenty-two episodes aired from 1990 to 1996. Guest stars included Brenda Blethyn, Jack Wild, and Andrew Howard.
