= Bloomin' Marvellous =

- Created by: John Godber
- Directed by: Dewi Humphreys
- Starring: Clive Mantle; Sarah Lancashire; Kathryn Hunt
- Country of origin: United Kingdom
- Original language: English
- No. of series: 1
- No. of episodes: 8

Production
- Producer: Sydney Lotterby
- Running time: 30 minutes

Original release
- Network: BBC1
- Release: 8 September – 27 October 1997

Bloomin' Marvellous is a 1997 BBC comedy series starring Clive Mantle, Sarah Lancashire, and Kathryn Hunt. Written by playwright John Godber, it is described as "a comedy about a couple who decide to start a family." The series was panned by most critics, and Mantle sarcastically remarked that "I've seen murderers and rapists get a better press than we did."

Bloomin' Marvellous was due to debut on BBC1 on 1 September 1997, but was postponed to the following week due to the death of Diana, Princess of Wales the night before. It was replaced by extended news coverage and by a documentary about the late princess.

== List of episodes ==
- Episode 1 (8 September 1997)
- Episode 2 (15 September 1997)
- Episode 3 (22 September 1997)
- Episode 4 (29 September 1997)
- Episode 5 (6 October 1997)
- Episode 6 (13 October 1997)
- Episode 7 (20 October 1997)
- Episode 8 (27 October 1997)
