= Cherished (film) =

2005 British TV drama

- Timothy Spall and Sarah Lancashire as Terry and Angela Cannings
- Genre: True crime
- Written by: Gwyneth Hughes
- Directed by: Robin Shepperd
- Starring: Sarah Lancashire; Timothy Spall; Jake Nightingale; Alison Lomas; Emma Cunniffe; James Barriscale; Ian McNeice
- Composer: Mark Russell
- Country of origin: United Kingdom
- Original language: English

Production
- Executive producers: Susan Hogg; Simon Lewis
- Producer: Polly Hill
- Cinematography: Daf Hobson
- Editor: Liz Webber
- Running time: 90 minutes
- Production company: BBC Drama Group

Original release
- Network: BBC One
- Release: 22 February 2005

Cherished is a single British true crime drama, written by acclaimed screenwriter Gwyneth Hughes, that first broadcast on BBC One on 22 February 2005. Starring Sarah Lancashire as protagonist Angela Cannings, the drama is based on Cannings' wrongful conviction for the deaths of two of her infant children, Jason and Matthew. Directed by Robin Sheppard, the drama also stars Timothy Spall as Angela's husband Terry, Emma Cunniffe as Angela's sister Claire; and Ian McNeice as her defence barrister; Bill Bache. The drama was a joint production between the BBC's drama and current affairs wings. 5.18 million viewers tuned in for the initial broadcast. Similarly to other true-life BBC productions of the time; Cherished has never been released on DVD.

Cannings herself said of the production; "We're still suffering the aftermath of this whole episode. This film is for Jade, so when she is older she can see what it was all about. The general public would assume that we've got back together and that's it. But there is an awful lot of healing. It doesn't just heal overnight. Even now I sit and think why we had to go through all that. We've had quite a lot to do with the scriptwriter, the BBC has been very good. They've dealt with us very fairly." Sarah Lancashire said of playing the part of Cannings; "I'm delighted to be playing the part of Angela. When I read the script I was very moved. The loss of any child is a dreadful thing, the loss of three is unimaginable. Whilst any parent could relate to the anguish that Terry and Angela must have felt I cannot comprehend the strength it must have taken to sustain Angela through even a part of a life sentence. Theirs is a remarkable story."

== Synopsis ==
The film begins in 1999, on the day of Matthew Cannings' death. Mother Angela (Sarah Lancashire), who is alone in the house at the time, is roused by the sound of a sleep apnea alarm fitted to Matthew's cot. Angela enters his room, only to find that Matthew is already dead. Angela immediately telephones her husband Terry (Timothy Spall), who rushes home from work and is shocked to discover Angela cradling Matthew in her arms. After Matthew is taken to the local hospital, the Cannings' doctor informs social services that Matthew's death is the third such death in the family since 1989. Two vulnerable persons detectives, DS Rob Findlay (Jake Nightingale) and WDC Jill Dawson (Alison Lomas), take on the case and interview Angela. As a post-mortem reveals traces of fibres in Matthew's nasal passage, Findlay and Dawson suspect that Matthew was smothered; although the evidence is not conclusive. Angela is arrested and taken in for questioning. Despite denying all of the accusations against her, Angela is charged with the murder of Matthew and two of her other children, Gemma and Jason, who died in 1989 and 1991 respectively.

The case is taken to court, and Angela is represented by defence lawyer Bill Bache (Ian McNeice), who is convinced that the jury cannot possibly find her guilty due to a lack of corroborative evidence and eyewitness testimony. Despite this, Angela is found guilty on two counts of murder (the other count, of Gemma's murder, is dropped before the trial begins). Angela goes to prison and faces daily abuse from her fellow inmates, who label her a 'nonce' and a 'baby killer'. Whilst in prison, a woman claiming to be Angela's half-sister comes forward, and through dogged detective work, Bache and his team of colleagues uncover a genetic history of Sudden Infant Death Syndrome in Angela's extended family. Coupled with the recent acquittal of Sally Clark, who was tried and found guilty of the murder of her two children based on statistical evidence provided by Sir Roy Meadow (Ronald Pickup), who also provided evidence in Angela's trial, Bache launches an appeal. On appeal, Angela's conviction is quashed and she is released from prison. Subsequently, an epilogue reveals that Angela's trial allowed for a change in the law which states that no single defendant can be found guilty in a criminal trial purely on the basis of evidence submitted by experts. Roy Meadow is also revealed to have been struck off by the General Medical Council.

== Cast ==
- Sarah Lancashire as Angela Cannings
- Timothy Spall as Terry Cannings
- Jake Nightingale as DS Rob Findlay
- Alison Lomas as WDC Jill Dawson
- Emma Cunniffe as Claire Connolly
- James Barriscale as Tom Sedley
- Ian McNeice as Bill Bache
- Julian Rivett as DS Matt Johnson
- Steve Chaplin as Steven Cannings
- Marion Bailey as Marion Harding
- Ronald Pickup as Sir Roy Meadow
- Maggie Ollerenshaw as Mary Barry
- Mark Tandy as Mr. Dunkels QC
- Stephen Boxer as Professor Patton
- Amber Wollen as Jade Cannings (Aged 3–5)
- Kizzie Hopkinson as Jade Cannings (Aged 5–7)
- Lorna Fitzgerald as Jade Cannings (Aged 7–9)
