= Hobart College =

Hobart College may refer to:

- Hobart and William Smith Colleges, Geneva, New York, U.S.
- Hobart College, Tasmania, Australia
