= The Dresser (2015 film) =

- Television release poster
- Based on: The Dresser; 1980 play by Ronald Harwood
- Screenplay by: Richard Eyre
- Directed by: Richard Eyre
- Starring: Ian McKellen; Anthony Hopkins; Emily Watson; Vanessa Kirby; Sarah Lancashire; Edward Fox
- Theme music composer: Stephen Warbeck
- Country of origin: United Kingdom
- Original language: English

Production
- Executive producers: Colin Callender; Sonia Friedman; Polly Hill
- Producers: Suzan Harrison; Scott Landis
- Cinematography: Ben Smithard
- Editor: Lesley Walker
- Running time: 109 minutes
- Production companies: BBC; Playground Entertainment; Sonia Friedman Productions

Original release
- Network: BBC Two
- Release: 31 October 2015

The Dresser is a 2015 British drama television film directed by Richard Eyre and based on the 1980 play by Ronald Harwood. It stars Ian McKellen, Anthony Hopkins, Emily Watson, Vanessa Kirby, Sarah Lancashire and Edward Fox. The story examines the relationship between an aging Shakespearean actor and his theatrical dresser, as well as the other members of his theatrical company, as he grapples with the approach of senility and irrelevance. Like the play which serves as its basis, the film's central relationship draws inspiration from Shakespeare's King Lear. The film premiered on BBC Two on 31 October 2015.

== Plot ==
The film centres on the relationship between an ageing Shakespearean actor, named only as "Sir", and his longtime theatrical dresser, Norman. It is set entirely in the backstage area (and briefly, the main stage) of a London playhouse during the Blitz.

It opens with a meeting between Norman and Sir's (apparent) wife, "Her Ladyship", in Sir's dressing room. She has just visited Sir in hospital, where he had been taken by Norman after being found erratically wandering the streets during an air raid. Sir is scheduled to play King Lear that evening. Norman pleads with Her Ladyship and company stage manager Madge to not cancel the show. As he begs, Sir appears in his dressing room, having discharged himself.

Sir insists on performing though obviously exhausted and approaching senility or dementia. He begins to prepare between bouts of amnesia and jealous weeping, accidentally blackening himself for the role of Othello and forgetting the lines which begin the play; meanwhile, Norman attempts to defuse his flaring temper with silliness and reminiscing. Various members of the company appear for Sir's appraisal, including the pretty young actress Irene toward whom Sir behaves inappropriately; demure and miscast Thornton in the role of Fool; and the standoffish Oxenby as Edmund, who refuses to "muck in" and assist with offstage production activities. Sir attempts to write in his memoirs without success.

The play starts. After initially missing his cue, Sir begins a passionate performance of the play's most important speeches. Oxenby begrudgingly assists with the backstage sounds for the storm scene, while Norman plainly relishes any role given to him in the running of the production.

During the interval in his dressing room, her Ladyship unsuccessfully implores Sir to retire. She laments his self-centredness and her own choice to live in his shadow, and threatens to leave the company and Sir. He pleads for her not to go, but after she relents, he turns malicious and belittles her hopes for a life outside his shadow. After she leaves, Sir summons Madge. He asks for his press clippings of theatrical reviews, and gives her an heirloom ring from actor Edmund Kean. Madge reveals she has loved Sir since her time at the company began. Irene then enters, and Sir makes a sexual advance after signing a photograph for her. Norman jealously listens through the door. He accosts Irene about what occurred and expels her from the company.

The play resumes, and Sir continues his performance. After the curtain falls, Sir changes out of his costume and shows some tenderness toward Norman, asking what will happen to him if Sir is unable to continue performing, an idea Norman dismisses. Thornton appears and expresses his joy at having played the principal role of Fool. Sir becomes distant and withdrawn, dismissing Norman's attempts at cheer. Her Ladyship appears to say a spiteful goodnight, followed by Oxenby, who diminishes Sir's authority in the company. Sir becomes distraught, and lies down to sleep. He asks Norman to read aloud the dedication to his memoirs; as Norman does so, Sir dies. Norman becomes spiteful towards Sir, who has failed to mention him in the dedications. He calls for Madge, and secretly adds "dresser" to the list of dedications. Madge is in tears, while Norman is bitter and hateful towards Sir. The two scrap, and Madge leaves distraught; Norman is left alone with Sir's body. He begins to tell one of the stories which used to cheer Sir, but stops himself.

== Cast ==
- Ian McKellen as Norman
- Anthony Hopkins as "Sir"
- Emily Watson as "Her Ladyship"
- Vanessa Kirby as Irene
- Sarah Lancashire as Madge
- Edward Fox as Thornton; Fox had played the role of Oxenby in the 1983 cinema film of the play
- Tom Brooke as Oxenby / Edmond
- Matthew Cottle as Albany
- Ian Conningham as Kent
- Helen Bradbury as Regan
- John Ashton as Gloucester
- Annalisa Rossi as Goneril
- Carl Sanderson as Cornwall

== Production ==
Filming began in London in March 2015.
