= 1995 in British music =

This is a summary of 1995 in music in the United Kingdom, including the official charts from that year.

== Summary ==
1995 saw a number of changes occur. Céline Dion's "Think Twice", which was released in October 1994 yet took until the end of January to reach the top, was the first UK number 1 single not to be available on vinyl in any form.

Around the middle of the year, the way singles entered the chart started to change. Instead of entering low and climbing up to their peak, singles would now usually enter at their peak, and then fall down the chart. In May, Robson & Jerome became the first British act to reach number 1 with "Unchained Melody", after having sung the song on the ITV programme Soldier Soldier. In May, music featured in an advertising campaign for Guinness reached number 2 – mambo tune "Guaglione" by Pérez Prado was a massive hit and the advert featured on an accompanying screensaver.

This was also the year which saw Britpop at its most popular. A highly publicised chart battle in August saw Oasis and Blur battling it out for the number 1 position, having both released their singles on the same day. Blur won the singles battle, with "Country House" beating Oasis' "Roll with It" to the top spot, but Oasis, with (What's the Story) Morning Glory?, would go on to greatly outsell Blur's album, the album of which would eventually become the second biggest album in the UK. After a decade in the business Pulp secured a first number one album while Britpop elder statesman Paul Weller also benefited from a return to popular and critical favour.

Singles that went on to sell over a million copies were Coolio's "Gangsta's Paradise", the first rap single to sell over a million in the UK, both of Robson & Jerome's songs ("Unchained Melody" / "White Cliffs of Dover", the biggest selling single of the year, and "I Believe" / "Up on the Roof") and Michael Jackson's "Earth Song". In addition, a second remix of New Order's "Blue Monday" (reaching number 17) pushed sales of that song over a million as well.

In all, there were 17 number one singles in 1995. As the 1990s continued the amount started to increase, and there wouldn't be a total as low as 1995's.

Composer Michael Tippett celebrated his ninetieth birthday on 2 January. the occasion was marked by special events in Britain, Canada and the US, including the premiere of his final work, The Rose Lake, in February. A collection of his essays, Tippett on Music, was also published. In July Thomas Adès' 1995 chamber opera Powder Her Face with a libretto by Philip Hensher won good reviews, but also notoriety for its musical depiction of fellatio. And there was further controversy and much negative press when Harrison Birtwistle's uncompromising Panic was included in the typically populist Last Night of the Proms in September. The same month Karl Jenkins had a huge popular hit with his album Adiemus: Songs of Sanctuary, thanks to the music's exposure in television advertisements.

== Events ==
- 19 January – The Cry of Anubis for tuba and orchestra by Harrison Birtwistle is performed for the first time at the Queen Elizabeth Hall.
- January – In a shake up to BBC Radio 1's playlist, controller Matthew Bannister states that "old music" (anything recorded before 1990) will be dropped from their playlists.
- 1 February – Richey Edwards, guitarist with the Manic Street Preachers, disappears. He would soon be reported as a "missing person", until 2008, when he became legally "presumed dead".
- 19 February – The Rose Lake for orchestra, the last major work by the 90 year-old Michael Tippett; is performed for the first time in London by the London Symphony Orchestra, conducted by Sir Colin Davis
- 24 February – Bruno Brookes is sacked from BBC Radio 1, after 11 years, by head of production, Trevor Dann. Brookes' contract, due to end in April, was not renewed. He presents his final programme for the station on 21 April.
- March – Drummer Reni leaves the Stone Roses, just weeks before the band are due to start their Second Coming tour. He is replaced by Robbie Maddix who remains with the band until their split a year later.
- 3 April – The Beltane Fire, a choreographic poem for orchestra by Peter Maxwell Davies, is performed for the first time at Symphony Hall in Boston, conducted by the composer.
- 24 April – Chris Evans becomes the new host of BBC Radio 1's breakfast show, replacing Steve Wright, who had ended his brief run as the programme's presenter on the 21st.
- 30 April – Drummer Tony McCarroll leaves Oasis, following a bust-up, and is later replaced by Alan White
- 17 May – The first British performance of John McCabe‘s Symphony No 4, Of Time and the River, takes place at the Royal Festival Hall, London, played by the BBC Symphony Orchestra, conductor David Atherton.
- 24 June – The Stone Roses pull out of their headline performance at the Glastonbury Festival, after guitarist John Squire fractures his collarbone in a mountain biking accident. They are replaced by Pulp.
- 25 June – Cardiac Arrest for seven players by Thomas Adès is performed for the first time, in the Purcell Room, London.
- 1 July – Powder Her Face, a chamber opera by Thomas Adès, is performed for the first time in the Everyman Theatre, Cheltenham.
- 17 July – Robbie Williams leaves Take That to pursue his solo career. Louise Nurding leaves Eternal on the same day and launches a solo career.
- 14 August – Blur's single "Country House" and Oasis' single "Roll with It" are released on the same day, leading to a media frenzy that would be tagged as "The Battle Of Britpop".
- 23 August – Sixty one years after his death, two works for orchestra by Frederick Delius are performed for the first time at Leeds University: La Quadroone (1889) and Scherzo (1890).
- 24 August – The Violin Concerto by Jonathan Lloyd is performed for the first time at the Aldeburgh Festival.
- 3 September – Overture on a Nursery Rhyme Op 75a by Robin Holloway is performed for the first time in Arundel Cathedral.
- 16 September – Panic, by Harrison Birtwistle, is featured in the last night of the Proms, a rare inclusion of contemporary music at that event, generating many complaints. “Unmitigated rubbish” says the Daily Express.
- 20 September – The Daily Mirror accuses Pulp of promoting drugs with their song "Sorted for E's & Wizz" and call for the single and its inside artwork to be banned.
- 2 October – Oasis release their second album (What's the Story) Morning Glory?. It sells a 345,000 copies in its first week, making it (at the time) the second-fastest selling album in British history
- 6 November – Queen release Made in Heaven, their final studio album, and their last album to include Freddie Mercury's final vocals.
- 8 November – First broadcast recording of Constant Lambert’s full length ballet score Tiresias on BBC Radio 3 by the BBC Concert Orchestra, conducted by Barry Wordsworth, 44 years after its premiere at the Royal Opera House, Covent Garden in July 1951.
- 15 November – World premiere of Peter Maxwell Davies’s The Three Kings takes place at the Barbican, conducted by Richard Hickox (LSO)
- 4 December – The Beatles release "Free as a Bird", originally an unreleased demo by John Lennon from 1977 and completed by the surviving Beatles, who incorporated the demo into a studio version.

== Charts ==
=== Number-one singles ===
Chart date (week ending)	Song	Artist(s)	Sales
7 January	"Stay Another Day"	East 17	98,000
14 January	"Cotton Eye Joe"	Rednex	76,000
21 January	"Cotton Eye Joe"	Rednex	100,000
28 January	"Cotton Eye Joe"	Rednex	81,000
4 February	"Think Twice"	Celine Dion	80,000
11 February	"Think Twice"	Celine Dion	81,000
18 February	"Think Twice"	Celine Dion	85,000
25 February	"Think Twice"	Celine Dion	124,000
4 March	"Think Twice"	Celine Dion	111,000
11 March	"Think Twice"	Celine Dion	78,000
18 March	"Think Twice"	Celine Dion	57,000
25 March	"Love Can Build a Bridge"	Cher, Chrissie Hynde & Neneh Cherry with Eric Clapton	125,000
1 April	"Don't Stop (Wiggle Wiggle)"	The Outhere Brothers	86,000
8 April	"Back for Good"	Take That	346,000
15 April	"Back for Good"	Take That	185,000
22 April	"Back for Good"	Take That	140,000
29 April	"Back for Good"	Take That	86,000
6 May	"Some Might Say"	Oasis	138,000
13 May	"Dreamer"	Livin' Joy	70,500
20 May	"Unchained Melody" / "White Cliffs of Dover"	Robson & Jerome	314,000
27 May	"Unchained Melody" / "White Cliffs of Dover"	Robson & Jerome	460,000
3 June	"Unchained Melody" / "White Cliffs of Dover"	Robson & Jerome	320,000
10 June	"Unchained Melody" / "White Cliffs of Dover"	Robson & Jerome	198,000
17 June	"Unchained Melody" / "White Cliffs of Dover"	Robson & Jerome	145,000
24 June	"Unchained Melody" / "White Cliffs of Dover"	Robson & Jerome	90,000
1 July	"Unchained Melody" / "White Cliffs of Dover"	Robson & Jerome	73,000
8 July	"Boom Boom Boom"	The Outhere Brothers	62,000
15 July	"Boom Boom Boom"	The Outhere Brothers	74,000
22 July	"Boom Boom Boom"	The Outhere Brothers	77,000
29 July	"Boom Boom Boom"	The Outhere Brothers	65,000
5 August	"Never Forget"	Take That	115,000
12 August	"Never Forget"	Take That	86,000
19 August	"Never Forget"	Take That	54,000
26 August	"Country House"	Blur	274,000
2 September	"Country House"	Blur	120,000
9 September	"You Are Not Alone"	Michael Jackson	83,000
16 September	"You Are Not Alone"	Michael Jackson	100,000
23 September	"Boombastic"	Shaggy	92,000
30 September	"Fairground"	Simply Red	211,000
7 October	"Fairground"	Simply Red	142,000
14 October	"Fairground"	Simply Red	129,000
21 October	"Fairground"	Simply Red	96,000
28 October	"Gangsta's Paradise"	Coolio featuring LV	107,000
4 November	"Gangsta's Paradise"	Coolio featuring LV	166,000
11 November	"I Believe" / "Up on the Roof"	Robson & Jerome	258,000
18 November	"I Believe" / "Up on the Roof"	Robson & Jerome	224,000
25 November	"I Believe" / "Up on the Roof"	Robson & Jerome	118,000
2 December	"I Believe" / "Up on the Roof"	Robson & Jerome	98,000
9 December	"Earth Song"	Michael Jackson	116,467
16 December	"Earth Song"	Michael Jackson	149,549
23 December	"Earth Song"	Michael Jackson	150,739
30 December	"Earth Song"	Michael Jackson	261,851

=== Number-one albums ===
Chart date (week ending)	Album	Artist
7 January	Carry On Up the Charts	The Beautiful South
14 January	Carry On Up the Charts	The Beautiful South
21 January	Carry On Up the Charts	The Beautiful South
28 January	The Colour of My Love	Celine Dion
4 February	The Colour of My Love	Celine Dion
11 February	The Colour of My Love	Celine Dion
18 February	The Colour of My Love	Celine Dion
25 February	The Colour of My Love	Celine Dion
4 March	The Colour of My Love	Celine Dion
11 March	Greatest Hits	Bruce Springsteen
18 March	Medusa	Annie Lennox
25 March	Elastica	Elastica
1 April	The Colour of My Love	Celine Dion
8 April	Wake Up!	The Boo Radleys
15 April	Greatest Hits	Bruce Springsteen
22 April	Picture This	Wet Wet Wet
29 April	Picture This	Wet Wet Wet
6 May	Picture This	Wet Wet Wet
13 May	Nobody Else	Take That
20 May	Nobody Else	Take That
27 May	Stanley Road	Paul Weller
3 June	Singles	Alison Moyet
10 June	Pulse	Pink Floyd
17 June	Pulse	Pink Floyd
24 June	HIStory: Past, Present and Future, Book I	Michael Jackson
1 July	These Days	Bon Jovi
8 July	These Days	Bon Jovi
15 July	These Days	Bon Jovi
22 July	These Days	Bon Jovi
29 July	I Should Coco	Supergrass
5 August	I Should Coco	Supergrass
12 August	I Should Coco	Supergrass
19 August	It's Great When You're Straight...Yeah	Black Grape
26 August	It's Great When You're Straight...Yeah	Black Grape
2 September	Said and Done	Boyzone
9 September	The Charlatans	The Charlatans
16 September	Zeitgeist	The Levellers
23 September	The Great Escape	Blur
30 September	The Great Escape	Blur
7 October	Daydream	Mariah Carey
14 October	(What's the Story) Morning Glory?	Oasis
21 October	Life	Simply Red
28 October	Life	Simply Red
4 November	Life	Simply Red
11 November	Different Class	Pulp
18 November	Made in Heaven	Queen
25 November	Robson & Jerome	Robson & Jerome
2 December	Robson & Jerome	Robson & Jerome
9 December	Robson & Jerome	Robson & Jerome
16 December	Robson & Jerome	Robson & Jerome
23 December	Robson & Jerome	Robson & Jerome
30 December	Robson & Jerome	Robson & Jerome

=== Number-one compilation albums ===
Chart date (week ending)	Album
7 January	Now 29
14 January	Now 29
21 January	Now 29
28 January	The Best of Heartbeat
4 February	The Best Punk Album in the World...Ever!'
11 February	Dance Mania 95 Volume 1
18 February	Dance Mania 95 Volume 1
25 February	On a Dance Tip
4 March	On a Dance Tip
11 March	On a Dance Tip
18 March	Smash Hits 95 Volume 1
25 March	Dance Zone Level 4
1 April	Dance Zone Level 4
8 April	Dance Mania 95 Volume 2
15 April	Dance Mania 95 Volume 2
22 April	Now 30
29 April	Now 30
6 May	Now 30
13 May	Now 30
20 May	On a Dance Tip 2
27 May	On a Dance Tip 2
3 June	On a Dance Tip 2
10 June	Top of the Pops 1
17 June	Top of the Pops 1
24 June	Dance Zone Level 5
1 July	Dance Zone Level 5
8 July	Dance Zone Level 5
15 July	Dance Mania 95 – Volume 3
22 July	Dance Mania 95 – Volume 3
29 July	Dance Mania 95 – Volume 3
5 August	The Best Summer...Ever!
12 August	Now 31
19 August	Now 31
26 August	Now 31
2 September	Now 31
9 September	Dance Zone Level 6
16 September	Help
23 September	Help
30 September	Heartbeat – Forever Yours
7 October	Heartbeat – Forever Yours
14 October	Heartbeat – Forever Yours
21 October	Heartbeat – Forever Yours
28 October	Heartbeat – Forever Yours
4 November	Heartbeat – Forever Yours
11 November	The Greatest Party Album Under the Sun
18 November	Pure Swing IV
25 November	Now 32
2 December	Now 32
9 December	Now 32
16 December	Now 32
23 December	Now 32
30 December	Now 32

== Year-end charts ==
=== Best-selling singles ===
No.	Title	Artist	Peak position
1	"Unchained Melody"/"(There'll Be Bluebirds Over) The White Cliffs of Dover"	Robson & Jerome	1
2	"Gangsta's Paradise"	Coolio featuring L.V.	1
3	"I Believe"/"Up on the Roof"	Robson & Jerome	1
4	"Back for Good"	Take That	1
5	"Think Twice"	Celine Dion	1
6	"Earth Song"	Michael Jackson	1
7	"Fairground"	Simply Red	1
8	"You Are Not Alone"	Michael Jackson	1
9	"Missing" (Todd Terry Club Mix)	Everything but the Girl	3
10	"Wonderwall"	Oasis	2
11	"Boom Boom Boom"	The Outhere Brothers	1
12	"Country House"	Blur	1
13	"Father and Son"	Boyzone	2
14	"Don't Stop (Wiggle Wiggle)"	The Outhere Brothers	1
15	"Boombastic"	Shaggy	1
16	"Cotton Eye Joe"	Rednex	1
17	"Set You Free" (Remix)	N-Trance	2
18	"Living Next Door to Alice (Who the F**k Is Alice?)"	Smokie featuring Roy Chubby Brown	3
19	"Hold Me, Thrill Me, Kiss Me, Kill Me"	U2	2
20	"Roll with It"	Oasis	2
21	"Guaglione"	Perez 'Prez' Prado & his Orchestra	2
22	"I'll Be There for You"	The Rembrandts	3
23	"Two Can Play That Game" (K Klassic Mix)	Bobby Brown	3
24	"Here Comes the Hotstepper"	Ini Kamoze	4
25	"Shy Guy"	Diana King	2
26	"It's Oh So Quiet"	Björk	4
27	"Never Forget"	Take That	1
28	"Don't Give Me Your Life"	Alex Party	2
29	"Waterfalls"	TLC	4
30	"Scatman (Ski Ba Bop Ba Dop Bop)"	Scatman John	3
31	"Some Might Say"	Oasis	1
32	"You'll See"	Madonna	5
33	"Thunder"	East 17	4
34	"Stayin' Alive"	N-Trance featuring Ricardo da Force	2
35	"I'd Lie for You (And That's the Truth)"	Meat Loaf	2
36	"Common People"	Pulp	2
37	"Fantasy"	Mariah Carey	4
38	"I've Got a Little Something for You"	MN8	2
39	"Kiss from a Rose"/"I'm Alive"	Seal	4
40	"Dreamer" (Remix)	Livin' Joy	1
41	"Heaven for Everyone"	Queen	2
42	"Free as a Bird"	The Beatles	2
43	"Love Can Build a Bridge"	Cher, Chrissie Hynde & Neneh Cherry with Eric Clapton	1
44	"(Everybody's Got to Learn Sometime) I Need Your Loving"	Baby D	3
45	"The Sunshine After the Rain"	Berri	4
46	"The Bomb! (These Sounds Fall into My Mind)"	The Bucketheads	5
47	"Wonderwall"	The Mike Flowers Pops	2
48	"Total Eclipse of the Heart"	Nicki French	5
49	"Alright"/"Time"	Supergrass	2
50	"Mis-Shapes"/"Sorted for E's & Wizz"	Pulp	2

=== Best-selling albums ===
No.	Title	Artist	Peak position
1	Robson & Jerome	Robson & Jerome	1
2	(What's the Story) Morning Glory?	Oasis	1
3	The Colour of My Love	Celine Dion	1
4	Life	Simply Red	1
5	HIStory: Past, Present and Future, Book I	Michael Jackson	1
6	Made in Heaven	Queen	1
7	Stanley Road	Paul Weller	1
8	Picture This	Wet Wet Wet	1
9	The Great Escape	Blur	1
10	Different Class	Pulp	1
11	Something to Remember	Madonna	3
12	Love Songs	Elton John	4
13	Carry On up the Charts: The Best of the Beautiful South	The Beautiful South	1
14	Medusa	Annie Lennox	1
15	Daydream	Mariah Carey	1
16	Nobody Else	Take That	1
17	Definitely Maybe	Oasis	5 (Note: Reached number 1 in 1994)
18	Bizarre Fruit/Bizarre Fruit II	M People	8 (Note: Reached number 3 in 1996 as the reissued Bizarre Fruit II)
19	Anthology 1	The Beatles	3
20	These Days	Bon Jovi	1
21	The Memory of Trees	Enya	5
22	No Need to Argue	The Cranberries	3 (Note: Reached number 2 in 1994)
23	Said and Done	Boyzone	1
24	Design of a Decade: 1986–1996	Janet Jackson	2
25	Parklife	Blur	2 (Note: Reached number 1 in 1994)
26	Jollification	The Lightning Seeds	15 (Note: Reached number 12 in 1996)
27	Greatest Hits	Bruce Springsteen	1
28	Dummy	Portishead	2
29	Greatest Hits (1985–1995)	Michael Bolton	2
30	Vault: Def Leppard Greatest Hits (1980–1995)	Def Leppard	3
31	Singles	Alison Moyet	1
32	Power of a Woman	Eternal	6
33	CrazySexyCool	TLC	4
34	I Should Coco	Supergrass	1
35	Welcome to the Neighbourhood	Meat Loaf	3
36	Post	Björk	2
37	Cross Road: The Best of Bon Jovi	Bon Jovi	4 (Note: Reached number 1 in 1994)
38	Big River	Jimmy Nail	8
39	It's Great When You're Straight... Yeah	Black Grape	1
40	Crocodile Shoes	Jimmy Nail	3 (Note: Reached number 2 in 1994)
41	Pulse	Pink Floyd	1
42	Pan Pipe Moods	Free the Spirit	2
43	Up All Night	East 17	7
44	The Very Best of Robert Palmer	Robert Palmer	4
45	Chants and Dances of the Native Americans	Sacred Spirit	9
46	Seal	Seal	3 (Note: Reached number 1 in 1994)
47	Monster	R.E.M.	8 (Note: Reached number 1 in 1994)
48	Tuesday Night Music Club	Sheryl Crow	8
49	Jagged Little Pill	Alanis Morissette	12 (Note: Reached number 1 in 1996)
50	Don't Bore Us – Get to the Chorus!: Roxette's Greatest Hits	Roxette	5

=== Best-selling compilation albums ===
No.	Title	Peak position
1	Now 32	1
2	The Love Album II	2
3	Now 30	1
4	The Best Rock Ballads in the World... Ever!	2
5	Now 31	1
6	Heartbeat: Forever Yours	1
7	Pulp Fiction Original Soundtrack	5
8	The Best Sixties Album in the World... Ever!	2
9	Dance Tip 95	3
10	Pure Swing IV	1

== Classical music ==
- Sally Beamish – Viola Concerto
- Harrison Birtwistle – Panic (premiered at Last Night of the Proms)
- Andrew Glover – Fractured Vistas
- Michael Tippett – "Caliban's Song"
- Graham Waterhouse – Celtic Voices and Hale Bopp

== Opera ==
- Thomas Adès – Powder Her Face

== Musical films ==
- England, My England, starring Michael Ball
- Pulse, Pink Floyd concert film

== Music awards ==
=== Brit Awards ===
The 1995 Brit Awards winners were:

- Best British producer: Nellee Hooper
- Best soundtrack: Pulp Fiction
- British album: Blur: Parklife
- British breakthrough act: Oasis
- British dance act: M People
- British female solo artist: Eddi Reader
- British Group: Blur
- British male solo artist: Paul Weller
- British single: Blur – "Parklife"
- British Video: Blur – "Parklife"
- International breakthrough act: Lisa Loeb
- International female: k.d. lang
- International group: R.E.M.
- International male: Prince
- Outstanding contribution: Elton John

=== Mercury Music Prize ===
The 1995 Mercury Music Prize was awarded to Portishead – Dummy.

== Births ==
- 13 January – Jonathan Antoine, tenor
- 11 April – Dodie Clark, singer songwriter and musician
- 14 May – Fox Jackson-Keen, actor, dancer and singer
- 23 June – Lauren Aquilina, singer-songwriter and musician
- 15 July – Elyar Fox, singer
- 23 July – Faryl Smith, singer
- 15 December – Leadley, singer-songwriter and musician
- 19 December – Elliot Evans, singer

== Deaths ==
- 11 January – Peter Pratt, opera singer, 71
- 14 January – Alexander Gibson, Scottish conductor, 68
- 22 January – Christopher Palmer, composer and author, 48
- 4 February – David Alexander, singer, 56
- 12 February – Tony Secunda, music industry manager, 54 (heart attack)
- 18 February – Denny Cordell, record producer, 51
- 2 March – Hugo Cole, composer and critic, 77
- 5 March – Vivian Stanshall, eccentric British musician, 51 (house fire)
- 7 March – John Lambert, composer, 68
- 20 March – Ella Halman, opera singer and actress, 98
- 23 March – Alan Barton, singer of Black Lace, 41 (road accident)
- 4 April – Kenny Everett, radio DJ and comedian, 50
- 12 April – Chris Pyne, jazz trombonist, 56
- 23 May – Mick Pyne, jazz pianist and brother of Chris Pyne, 54
- 9 June – Frank Chacksfield, pianist, organist, composer and arranger, 81
- 19 June – Murray Dickie, opera singer, 71
- 14 June – Rory Gallagher, Irish guitarist, singer, songwriter and producer, 47
- 1 July – Ian Parkin, guitarist (Be-Bop Deluxe), 45
- 12 July – Sean Mayes, pianist and writer.
- 11 August – Herbert Sumsion, organist and composer, 96
- 18 August – Alan Dell BBC Radio 2 disc jockey, 71
- 21 August – Anatole Fistoulari, Ukrainian-born conductor, 88
- 9 September – Ida Carroll, musician and composer, 89
- 22 September – Dolly Collins, folk musician, 62
- 27 September – Christopher Shaw, composer, 71
- 30 October
  - Brian Easdale, composer, 86
  - Paul Ferris, film composer, 54 (suicide)
- 31 October – Alan Bush, pianist and composer, 94
- 4 November – Marti Caine, entertainer, 50 (lymphatic cancer)
- 17 November – Alan Hull, singer-songwriter and founder of Lindisfarne, 50 (heart thrombosis)
- 21 November
  - Peter Grant, music industry manager, 60 (myocardial infarction)
  - Matthew Ashman, guitarist of Adam and the Ants, Bow Wow Wow, 35
- 18 December – Brian Brockless, composer, organist and conductor, 69

== See also ==
- 1995 in British radio
- 1995 in British television
- 1995 in the United Kingdom
- List of British films of 1995
