= 1995 in British television =

This is a list of British television related events from 1995.

== Events ==
=== January ===
- 2 January – The network television premiere on BBC2 of The Doors, Oliver Stone's critically acclaimed biopic of Jim Morrison, starring Val Kilmer.
- 3 January – The legal drama Kavanagh QC makes its debut on ITV, starring John Thaw.
- 4 January – The network television premiere on ITV of Chris Walas's 1989 horror sequel The Fly II, starring Eric Stoltz, Daphne Zuniga, Lee Richardson and John Getz with a special appearance from Jeff Goldblum.
- 5 January – Jack Dee guest presents an edition of Top of the Pops.
- 9 January – Sky One begins 24-hour broadcasting, filling the overnight hours with music videos under the name Hit Mix Long Play.
- 16 January – BBC World Service Television officially closes, ahead of the launch of two separate channels – BBC World and BBC Prime.
- 24 January – Martine McCutcheon makes her EastEnders debut as Tiffany Raymond, later Mitchell.
- 26 January – At 7:00pm London Time, BBC World Service Television is launched, offering two services:
  - BBC World (since renamed BBC News): A 24-hour English free-to-air terrestrial international news channel: news bulletins, information, business and financial news magazines and current affairs programmes .
  - BBC Prime (since replaced by BBC Entertainment): A 24-hour English cable lifestyle, variety and entertainment channel: variety, culture, leisure, lifestyle, art and light entertainment programmes.
- 27 January – Debut of the medical drama Dangerfield on BBC1, starring Nigel Le Vaillant.
- 29 January – The start of BBC2's weekly roundup of proceedings in the O. J. Simpson murder trial with The Trial of O. J. Simpson.
- 30 January
  - BBC Prime is launched at 7:00pm London Time.
  - The most watched episode of Brookside is broadcast on Channel 4, in which the body of Trevor Jordache is found under the patio.

=== February ===
- 1 February – The US medical drama series ER makes its British debut on Channel 4.
- 2 February – Kylie Minogue guest presents an edition of Top of the Pops.
- 3 February – An edition of the live morning ITV discussion show The Time, The Place abruptly ends ten minutes early after an item about men's fashion features a black male model wearing a skirt while another black man in the audience starts complaining that the show is racist, eventually making his way onto the stage.
- 5 February – The network television premiere on ITV of Chris Columbus's 1990 holiday comedy Home Alone, starring Macaulay Culkin, Joe Pesci, Daniel Stern, John Heard and Catherine O'Hara.
- 9 February – Gary Olsen guest presents an edition of Top of the Pops.
- 10 February – After a pilot episode broadcast in December 1993, the first full series of The Mrs Merton Show starts on BBC2, presented by Caroline Aherne as the titular character.
- 13 February
  - The network television premiere on ITV of Deceived, starring Goldie Hawn and John Heard.
  - Launch of ITV Night Time, a new late night programming strand produced by London News Network. Initially only airing in the London region (Carlton & LWT) upon launch, the service is introduced to the majority of the other ITV regions serving England in June.
- 14 February – Sky One hosts Sky's first telethon, to raise money for the Variety Club.
- 16 February – Cable channel Wire TV is sold to Mirror Television, owned by the parent company of the Daily Mirror newspaper. It plans to launch Sportswire as a full-time channel and replace Wire TV with a new channel called L!VE TV.
- 19 February – The 10th anniversary of the launch of the soap EastEnders on BBC1. As part of the celebrations, the first 25 episodes from 1985 are repeated each day at 10am during February and March, starting from episode one on Monday 20 February and ending on Friday 26 May. while selected episodes from 1985 and 1986 are also repeated on BBC1 on Fridays at 8:30pm for a short while. Billed as The Unforgettable EastEnders the episodes aired are as follows:
  - 17 February: The identity of the father of Michelle Fowler's baby is revealed in October 1985.
  - 24 February: Michelle and Lofty's wedding day in September 1986.
  - 3 March: Den Watts hands Angie divorce papers on Christmas Day 1986, an episode originally watched by more than 30 million viewers.
  - 10 March: Two-hander episode featuring Dot and Ethel from July 1987.
- 23 February – Peter Cunnah of D:Ream guest presents an edition of Top of the Pops.
- 25 February
  - BBC2 airs a documentary about the Rev. W. Awdry called The Thomas the Tank Engine Man as part of their Bookmark series. It is narrated by Hilary Fortnam, Awdry's daughter, and includes a look at the Thomas merchandise, the success of Thomas, images from the original Railway Series books with stock narration by John Gielgud, interviews with several people such as Mr Awdry himself, fans of Thomas, Awdry's son Christopher, children's author and poet Michael Rosen, various people who worked on the books and toys, Brian Sibley who also wrote the Reverend's autobiography, the people behind the television broadcasts and rights of Thomas in Japan and the producers of the television series Britt Allcroft and David Mitton, plus a special behind the scenes peek of the 100th episode Thomas and the Special Letter and Mr Awdry criticising the third series episode Henry's Forest.
  - The final episode of the light entertainment series Don't Forget Your Toothbrush is broadcast on Channel 4.
- 27–28 February – Sky One airs Episode 404 of E Street, the final episode of the Australian soap, splitting the hour-long edition into two half-hour episodes.

=== March ===
- 1 March – TV Asia is renamed Zee TV following the sale of the business to Zee's owner Subash Chandra.
- 2 March – Keith Allen guest presents an edition of Top of the Pops.
- 4 March – Channel 4 airs "Pot Night", eight hours of programming dedicated to cannabis.
- 11 March – Channel 4:
  - Begins airing a rerun of the Dick Clement and Ian La Frenais' comedy-drama Auf Wiedersehen, Pet, which made its debut on ITV on 11 November 1983.
  - Debuts "Red Light Zone", a season of "late-night programming focusing on sex, the sex industries and sexual tourism". The strand runs weekly for eight weeks.
- 12 March – Debut of Kay Mellor's crime drama series Band of Gold on ITV, starring Geraldine James, Cathy Tyson, Barbara Dickson and Samantha Morton, which focuses on a group of prostitutes who live and work in Bradford's red-light district.
- 15 March – As part of the Modern Times series, BBC2 airs Death on Request, a Dutch documentary showing a doctor giving a terminally-ill patient a lethal injection of drugs. The programme is criticized by groups opposed to euthanasia.
- 16 March – Lenny Henry guest presents an edition of Top of the Pops.
- 17 March – The Night of Comic Relief, the 1995 Comic Relief telethon is broadcast on BBC1.
- 24 March
  - Following the recent death of James Herriot (Alf Wight), BBC1 airs A Tribute to James Herriot in which Robert Hardy introduces a 1980 episode of the series All Creatures Great and Small, which was based on Herriot's memoirs as a Yorkshire vet.
  - The final episode of The Word is broadcast on Channel 4 after five years on the air.
- 29 March – Trinity College, Cambridge wins the 1994–95 series of University Challenge on BBC2, beating New College, Oxford 390–180.
- 30 March
  - P.J. and Duncan guest present an edition of Top of the Pops.
  - The third series of the hugely popular sitcom Absolutely Fabulous begins on BBC1.

=== April ===
- 1 April
  - Confessions makes its debut on BBC1. The programme is developed from Simon Mayo's Confessions feature on his BBC Radio 1 programme.
  - The action/science-fiction series Bugs makes its debut on BBC1.
  - The US medical drama series Chicago Hope makes its UK debut on BBC1.
- 3 April – A Scottish court imposes a prohibition on BBC Scotland airing an edition of Panorama that includes an interview with Prime Minister John Major amid concerns it could affect local elections to be held on 6 April. However, the edition is broadcast in England and Wales.
- 8 April–20 May – ITV shows the LWT-made cue sports tournament Tenball, a variant of snooker with elements of pool. It is won by Jimmy White, but neither show nor sport are revived after this single season.
- 10 April – Conservative MP Jonathan Aitken calls a televised press conference three hours before the transmission of a World in Action film, Jonathan of Arabia, demanding that allegations about his dealings with leading Saudis to be withdrawn. He promises to wield "the simple sword of truth and the trusty shield of British fair play ... to cut out the cancer of bent and twisted journalism." After launching a subsequent libel case against the makers of the film, Aitken is sentenced to 18 months in prison for perjuring himself.
- 13 April – Phill Jupitus guest presents an edition of Top of the Pops.
- 17 April – ITV airs an adaptation of the Joanna Trollope novel A Village Affair.
- 21 April – Channel 4 airs the first episode of the Irish sitcom Father Ted starring Dermot Morgan and Ardal O'Hanlon.
- 22 April – Fully Booked replaces Parallel 9 as BBC1's Saturday morning Summer children's show.
- 27 April – Chris Evans guest presents an edition of Top of the Pops.
- 28 April – The hugely popular US sitcom Friends makes its UK debut on Channel 4.
- 29 April
  - The final edition of ITV's Saturday morning show What's Up Doc? is broadcast. It is replaced the following Saturday by Scratchy & Co.
  - The final episode of You Bet! presented by Matthew Kelly is broadcast on ITV.

=== May ===
- 1 May – ITV airs what is billed as a one-off episode of Boon. The episode, Thieves Like Us, was originally due to air at the end of series 7 in 1992/93.
- 2 May
  - Closing date for applications to run Channel 5. Four bids are received, from New Century TV Ltd (British Sky Broadcasting, Goldman Sachs, Granada Group, Hoare Govett, Kinnevik, Polygram, Really Useful Group and TCI International) who bid £2,000,000, Virgin TV Ltd with a bid of £22,002,000, UKTV (CanWest Global Communications Corp., Scandinavian Broadcast System SA, SelectTV Plc, The Ten Group Ltd) who bid £36,261,158 and Channel 5 Broadcasting Ltd (MAI (now United News and Media Plc), CLT/UFA, Pearson Plc, Warburg Pincus & Co) with a bid of £22,002,000.
  - Debut of News '45, a news bulletin-style programme presented by Sue Lawley to mark the 50th anniversary of VE Day on BBC1.
- 4 May – Whigfield guest presents an edition of Top of the Pops.
- 8 May
  - The 50th anniversary of VE Day is widely marked with a series of television programmes.
  - The network television premiere of John Singleton's 1991 drama Boyz n the Hood on BBC2, starring Ice Cube and Cuba Gooding Jr.
- 9 May – The US/Canadian police comedy drama Due South makes its UK debut on BBC1.
- 11 May – Channel 4 screens a shortened version of the controversial film The Maltese Double Cross – Lockerbie, which disputes the conclusion reached by the official investigation into the bombing of Pan Am Flight 103, instead advancing the theory that the bomb was introduced onto the aircraft by an unwitting drug mule, Khaled Jafaar, in what the filmmaker claims is a CIA-protected suitcase. The film draws criticism from some American relatives of the victims, who accuse Channel 4 of giving air-time to what they claim as "Libyan propaganda."
- 13 May – Norwegian duo Secret Garden win the 40th Eurovision Song Contest (staged in Dublin and broadcast in the UK by the BBC) with "Nocturne". The UK entry, "Love City Groove" performed by rap group Love City Groove, finishes in 10th place.
- 15 May – Bruce Gyngell, the former chairman of the breakfast station TV-am, becomes Yorkshire–Tyne Tees Television's managing director.
- 22 May – The toy shop format of Rainbow is broadcast for the final time as it is axed due to poor reception. It is to be replaced a year later with Rainbow Days.
- 25 May – Stewart Lee and Richard Herring guest present an edition of Top of the Pops.
- 25 May–24 June – ITV provides coverage of the 1995 Rugby World Cup from South Africa as the first Rugby World Cup to be held entirely in one country since it was banned in South Africa during the apartheid regime.
- May – TCI, owner of Telewest, and NYNEX, do a deal which includes a clause that the cable operators do not launch any rival channels to those already operated by Sky. This marks the end of Cable Program Partners One, which had been set up to try to provide alternative content to the satellite-dominated multi-channel environment, and causes the collapse of its sports channel Sportswire just days before its launch as full time service.
- 31 May – Debut of the new twice-weekly soap Castles on BBC1, focusing on the lives of the middle-class Castle family. The series attracts a relatively poor peak time audience of 3.2 million, leading the corporation's head of Drama, Charles Denton to brand it a failure. It is cancelled after 26 episodes with the last episode airing on 20 August.

=== June ===
- 1 June
  - SelecTV launches on cable. Broadcasting drama, comedy and entertainment, the channel airs on weekdays between 17:00 and 00:00 and at the weekend between 12:00 and 00:00.
  - Despite the closure of Wire TV the previous day, Sportswire does not launch following TCI (owners of Telewest) and NYNEX's deal with British Sky Broadcasting.
- 2 June – The new British adult service Television X – The Fantasy Channel is launched, which broadcasts between 10.00pm and 5.30am.
- 5 June
  - Granada's Night Time presentation is dropped after seven years, as it is fully absorbed into the late night service produced by LNN.
  - ITN's Early Evening News is revamped with a new look inspired by News at Ten. The new titles are produced by Lambie-Nairn. The new look is rolled out across weekend and overnight bulletins by July, having been introduced on the lunchtime bulletin in March.
- 12 June – Mirror Group Newspapers launches the cable channel L!VE TV. It broadcasts continuous live programming from its base on the 24th floor of London's Canary Wharf with output containing a rolling mix of celebrities, interviews, reviews, lifestyle features and reports from events and happenings across the UK.
- 15 June
  - Michelle Gayle guest presents an edition of Top of the Pops.
  - Sue Cook presented her final edition of Crimewatch UK.
- 20 June – The network television premiere on ITV of Tony Scott's 1991 buddy action comedy The Last Boy Scout, starring Bruce Willis and Damon Wayans.
- 22 June
  - Prime Minister John Major's intention to resign and stand in a Conservative Party leadership election is announced on screen as England are playing France in the Rugby World Cup third place play off.
  - Cable television channel Channel One announces the acquisition of rights to air two-and-a-half hours of Wimbledon highlights for the next three-year period of secondary rights.
- 27 June – the final episode of The Legends of Treasure Island airs on Children's ITV.
- 29 June – Debut of Gaytime TV on BBC2, the BBC's first gay magazine programme.

=== July ===
- 3 July – Bell Cablemedia is formed when a number of cable companies, including Jones Cable UK, merge.
- 5 July – Bob Holness presented his final edition of Blockbusters.
- 6 July – Wendy Lloyd guest presents an edition of Top of the Pops.
- 8 July
  - BBC1 repeats the 1994 reality special Girl Friday in which Joanna Lumley spends nine days on a desert island with just a basic survival kit, partly self-filmed.
  - Lee Griffiths wins the sixth series of Stars in Their Eyes on ITV, performing as Bobby Darin.
  - The final edition of the long-running darts-based game show Bullseye is broadcast on ITV. It would be briefly revived on Challenge in 2006.
- 9 July
  - For the first time, the BBC shows live coverage of the Wimbledon Championships – Men's singles final in tennis on BBC1. Previously, it has been shown on BBC2 as part of Sunday Grandstand.
  - Marion Macfarlane wins the 1995 series of MasterChef on BBC1.
- 13 July – Dale Winton guest presents an edition of Top of the Pops.
- 20 July – Gayle Tuesday guest presents an edition of Top of the Pops.
- 26 July – BBC Enterprises, the BBC's commercial arm, is restructured as BBC Worldwide Ltd.
- 27 July – Craig McLachlan guest presents an edition of Top of the Pops.

=== August ===
- 2 August – Channel 4 begins a season of documentaries and features for gay and lesbian viewers.
- 10 August – The final episode of The Crystal Maze is broadcast on Channel 4; it will be revived in 2016.
- 14 August – The sitcom Oh, Doctor Beeching! makes its debut on BBC1.
- 15 August – Sue Lawley presents News '45: VJ Day on BBC1 to mark the 50th anniversary of VJ Day and the conclusion of World War II.
- 17 August – ITV airs the 2,000th episode of Emmerdale.
- 27 August – Speaking at the Edinburgh Television Festival, Michael Mansfield QC, one of Britain's leading barristers, calls for television cameras to be admitted into English courts to help demystify the legal process and restore public confidence in it.
- 28 August – The Krypton Factor returns to ITV after a two-year break with a new format, presented by Gordon Burns with Penny Smith.
- 30 August – The first National Television Awards are held at the Wembley Conference Centre and presented by Eamonn Holmes.

=== September ===
- 2 September
  - Dyke TV, the first television series aimed at lesbians, makes its debut on Channel 4.
  - The game show Raise the Roof makes its debut on ITV; it is presented by Bob Holness, and contestants can win a house worth £100,000. However, the series is not a success and it is axed in January 1996.
- 4 September
  - Carlton introduces new idents.
  - The Price Is Right is relaunched under the name Bruce's Price Is Right, presented by Bruce Forsyth.
- 5 September
  - The US animated fantasy sitcom featuring Felix the Cat called The Twisted Tales of Felix the Cat makes its UK debut on ITV before airing in its homeland on 16 September.
  - Jill Dando succeeds Sue Cook as co-presenter of Crimewatch alongside Nick Ross.
  - The Jerry Springer Show makes its UK TV debut on UK Living and is aired twice weekly at 7pm.
  - Mr. Men and Little Miss debuts on ITV.
- 10 September – BBC Wales relaunches its rugby union coverage under the name of Scrum V. It replaces Rugby Special Wales.
- 11 September
  - The children's stop-motion animated series Oakie Doke makes its debut on BBC1.
  - The final edition of the long-running dance competition Come Dancing is broadcast on BBC1, although special editions would air until 1998.
- 12 September
  - The children's animated series Oscar's Orchestra, featuring the voice of Dudley Moore, makes its debut on BBC1. The series is designed to inspire children with the delights of classical music and incorporates orchestral works from famous composers such as Ludwig van Beethoven and Johann Sebastian Bach.
  - Debut of the sitcom Is It Legal? on ITV and later on Channel 4.
- 14 September – Debut of the sports-themed comedy panel show They Think It's All Over on BBC1, presented by Nick Hancock.
- 24 September
  - Pride and Prejudice, the massively popular TV adaptation of Jane Austen's novel, makes its debut on BBC1. The six-part serial finishes on 29 October.
  - The network television premiere of Arthur Hiller's 1992 baseball drama The Babe on BBC2, starring John Goodman as American baseball legend George Herman ‘‘Babe’’ Ruth.
- 28 September – Star Trek: Deep Space Nine makes its UK debut on BBC2 with the feature-length episode Emissary.
- September
  - STV acquires a 20% stake in HTV worth £36 million as part of a deal with Flextech.
  - Janet Street-Porter resigns from L!VE TV and is replaced by Kelvin MacKenzie who axes the rolling content and replaces it with programmes that quickly earn it a reputation as tabloid television.
  - The BBC Select name for overnight educational programming is used for the final time.

=== October ===
- 1 October
  - Six years after it was originally planned, the British version of the Disney Channel goes on the air.
  - The Sci-Fi Channel launches. However, its full schedule, 8am to 2am, is only available to cable viewers as satellite subscribers are only able to see the channel for a few hours each day as it shares transponder space with a number of other channels.
  - The UK's first Christian channel, Christian Channel Europe, launches. It broadcasts for three hours each day, between 4am and 7am.
- 7–28 October – Cable channel L!VE TV broadcasts matches from the 1995 Rugby League World Cup. It shows many of them exclusively, because, apart from the opening game, the BBC does not show any live matches until the semi-final stage.
- 8 October
  - BBC2 airs the final edition of The Trial of O. J. Simpson as coverage of the trial draws to a conclusion.
  - The BBC's subscription service BBC Select ends after three years on the air.
- 9 October – Launch of The Learning Zone, an education service shown overnight on BBC2.
- 12 October – ITV airs Bait, an episode of The Bill that concludes a three-part story and sees the exit of the character Jo Morgan, played by Mary Jo Randle, who is shot while trying to warn June Ackland (Trudie Goodwin) of an impending attack on her car.
- 15 October – The final edition of Challenge Anneka is broadcast on BBC1.
- 16 October
  - After 25 years as Coronation Street landlady Bet Lynch (Julie Goodyear) makes her final regular appearance in the soap. She briefly returns to the show in 2002 and 2003 and stars in a spin-off series, Coronation Street: After Hours, in 1999. At the time of her departure, Goodyear has recently received a Lifetime Achievement Award at the inaugural National Television Awards.
  - ITV airs a five-part documentary every weekday celebrating 40 years of their children's input since the launch of the network in 1955, Simply the Best: CITV.
- 20 October – Channel 5 Broadcasting Limited is awarded the licence to launch Channel 5. It is a consortium of four investors, Pearson, United News and Media, CLT-Ufa and Warburg Pincus.
- 21 October
  - Comedian Jim Davidson succeeds Bruce Forsyth as presenter of The Generation Game on BBC1.
  - The short-lived US science-fiction series VR.5 makes its debut on Sky One.
  - The network television premiere of Tim Burton's 1992 blockbuster sequel Batman Returns, starring Michael Keaton, Michelle Pfeiffer, Danny DeVito and Christopher Walken on ITV.
  - The network television premiere of Sheldon Lettich's 1991 American martial arts action thriller Double Impact on ITV, starring Jean-Claude Van Damme, Geoffrey Lewis, Alan Scarfe, Bolo Yeung and Philip Chan Yan Kin, with a special appearance by female bodybuilder and fitness expert Cory Everson.
- 22 October – Jenna Tinson wins the 1995 series of Junior MasterChef on BBC1.
- 23 October – The first episode of the soap Hollyoaks is broadcast on Channel 4.
- 31 October – The final episode of Mr. Bean is broadcast on ITV with Goodnight Mr. Bean. But, it continued with both on VHS, the final half-hour episode, Hair by Mr. Bean of London on 15 November, and a clip special, The Best Bits of Mr. Bean on 21 October, 1996.

=== November ===
- 1 November – Four more satellite and cable channels launch in the UK with European Business News, Playboy TV, The Paramount Channel and Sky Sports Gold.
- 11 November
  - The History Channel launches in the UK.
  - The network television premiere on ITV of Mick Jackson's 1992 romantic drama thriller The Bodyguard, starring Kevin Costner and singer Whitney Houston.
- 12 November – BBC2 airs Twin Peaks: Fire Walk with Me, David Lynch's 1992 prequel to the acclaimed series Twin Peaks, starring Sheryl Lee, Ray Wise and Kyle MacLachlan.
- 13 November – Debut on BBC1 of the sitcom The Thin Blue Line, starring Rowan Atkinson.
- 19 November – ITV airs The Beatles Anthology, a six-part documentary series chronicling the career of The Beatles, which leads to the release of two previously unreleased songs, "Free as a Bird" and "Real Love".
- 20 November
  - Zee TV launches in the UK.
  - The cookery series Can't Cook, Won't Cook makes its debut on BBC1.
  - The final edition of The Krypton Factor is broadcast on ITV, although it would be revived in 2009.
  - During an hour-long interview with Martin Bashir for the BBC's Panorama, the Princess of Wales speaks about her marriage to the Prince of Wales and his affair with Camilla Parker Bowles, and admits to her intimate relationship with James Hewitt. An estimated 22.78 million watch the interview, the all-time record for a British current affairs programme. It is subsequently acknowledged by the BBC that Bashir had used forged documents to win Diana's trust to secure the interview.
- 22 November – After Virgin TV challenges the ITC's decision to award the licence to run the UK's fifth television channel to Channel 5 Broadcasting Ltd, the High Court grants leave for a judicial review into the decision.

=== December ===
- 1 December – L!VE TV launches L!ve’s first local out-out, covering the Westminster area of London.
- 2–3 December – Channel 4 airs "Soap Weekend", a weekend of programming dedicated to soap operas with documentaries and classic episodes of series including EastEnders, Neighbours and Brookside.
- 13 December – Granada plc and BSkyB agree to create a joint venture to operate four services.
- 18 December – BBC1 shows the network premiere of the 1986 fantasy action adventure film Highlander, starring Christopher Lambert and Sean Connery.
- 24 December – A Close Shave, the third short film starring Wallace and Gromit, makes its debut on BBC2, featuring the voices of Peter Sallis and Anne Reid.
- 25 December
  - The network television premiere on BBC1 of Steven Spielberg's 1991 fantasy film Hook, starring Robin Williams, Dustin Hoffman, Julia Roberts and Bob Hoskins. The film was first shown on Sky Movies on 25 December 1993.
  - Christmas Day highlights on BBC1 include the network television premiere of Adrian Lyne's 1993 drama Indecent Proposal, starring Robert Redford, Demi Moore and Woody Harrelson.
  - The final episode of the sitcom Keeping Up Appearances is broadcast on BBC1.
  - ITV shows the network premiere of the 1992 comedy film Sister Act, starring Whoopi Goldberg.
- 31 December – New Year's Eve highlights on BBC1 include Songs of Praise on Ice from the Blackpool Pleasure Beach Ice Arena and the network television premiere of Baz Luhrmann's 1992 comedy romance Strictly Ballroom.
- December – Channel 4 airs the documentary Sex with Paula, in which Paula Yates talks to celebrities about their love lives. Originally made in 1986, the programme was deemed to be unsuitable for audiences at the time, owing to its perceived message of promiscuity at the height of the AIDS epidemic.

== Debuts ==
=== BBC1 ===
- 1 January
  - Little Lord Fauntleroy (1995)
  - Cold Comfort Farm (1995)
- 3 January – Timekeepers (1995–1996)
- 4 January
  - Elidor (1995)
  - Devil's Advocate (1995)
- 5 January
  - Down to Earth (1995)
  - Robinson Sucroe (1994–1995)
- 8 January – Tears Before Bedtime (1995)
- 11 January – The Private Life of Plants (1995)
- 12 January – Bad Boys (1995–1996)
- 20 January – The Plant (1995)
- 21 January – Ghosts (1995)
- 27 January – Dangerfield (1995–1999)
- 5 February – The Buccaneers (1995)
- 15 February – The Biz (1995–1997)
- 23 February – Crown Prosecutor (1995)
- 19 March – The Choir (1995)
- 26 March – Hamish Macbeth (1995–1997)
- 1 April
  - Confessions (1995–1998)
  - Bugs (1995–1999)
  - Chicago Hope (1994–2000)
- 4 April – Monty the Dog who wears glasses (1995)
- 14 April – BBC Wildlife Specials (1995–present)
- 9 May – Due South (1995–1999)
- 13 May – Rumble (1995)
- 14 May – The Hanging Gale (1995)
- 15 May – Next of Kin (1995–1997)
- 17 May – Glad Rags (1995)
- 21 May – The Vet (1995–1996)
- 23 May – Out of the Blue (1995–1996)
- 31 May
  - Castles (1995)
  - Monkhouse's Memory Masters (1995)
- 11 June – Oliver's Travels (1995)
- 27 June – Bump in the Night (1994–1995)
- 26 July – Match of the Seventies (1995–1996)
- 27 July – Resort to Murder (1995)
- 14 August – Oh, Doctor Beeching! (1995–1997)
- 28 August – Atletico Partick (1995–1996)
- 4 September – The Peter Principle (1995–1997, 2000)
- 7 September – Backup (1995–1997)
- 10 September – Soul Survivors (1995)
- 11 September – Oakie Doke (1995–1997)
- 12 September – Oscar's Orchestra (1995–2000)
- 13 September – People's Century (1995–1997)
- 14 September – They Think It's All Over (1995–2006)
- 19 September – How to Be a Little Sod (1995)
- 24 September – Pride and Prejudice (1995)
- 29 September – Julia Jekyll and Harriet Hyde (1995–1998)
- 5 November – The Final Cut (1995)
- 13 November – The Thin Blue Line (1995–1996)
- 15 November – The Queen's Nose (1995–2003)
- 20 November – Can't Cook, Won't Cook (1995–2000)
- 23 December – Nick and Noel (1993)
- 30 December – Iznogoud (1995)
- 31 December – Black Hearts in Battersea (1995–1996)

=== BBC2 ===
- 5 January – Jeremy Clarkson's Motorworld (1995–1996)
- 7 January – The Last Machine (1995) (film documentary)
- 10 January – The Tick (1994–1996)
- 16 January – Signs and Wonders (1995)
- 10 February – The Mrs Merton Show (1995–1998)
- 13 February – Blood and Peaches (1995)
- 23 February – The Glam Metal Detectives (1995)
- 27 February – Game On (1995–1998)
- 11 April – Fist of Fun (1995–1996)
- 16 April – Persuasion (1995)
- 22 April – Fully Booked (1995–1999)
- 1 May – The Outer Limits (1995–2002)
- 15 May – The Music Biz (1995) (music documentary)
- 24 June
  - The Saturday Night Armistice (1995–1999)
  - Rock Family Trees (1995)
- 29 June – Gaytime TV (1995–1999)
- 18 August – Pulp Video (1995)
- 3 September – The Death of Yugoslavia (1995)
- 12 September – Nautilus (1995) (documentary series)
- 13 September – Degrees of Error (1995)
- 16 September – Love Bites (Anthology – 3 dramas: Go Now / Loved Up / In Your Dreams) (1995)
- 14 October – The Widowing of Mrs. Holroyd (1995)
- 16 October – Going, Going, Gone (1995–1998)
- 19 October – In the Company of Men (1995)
- 16 November – The Ghostbusters of East Finchley (1995)
- 17 November – Coogan's Run (1995)
- 24 December – A Close Shave (1995)

=== ITV ===
- 2 January – A Mind to Murder (1995)
- 3 January – Kavanagh QC (1995–2001)
- 6 January – The Glass Virgin (1995)
- 9 January – Lucky Numbers (1995–1997)
- 1 February – Thief Takers (1995–1997)
- 10 February – Tales from the Cryptkeeper (1993–1999)
- 20 February – Beyond Reason (1995)
- 26 February – The Gambling Man (1995)
- 5 March – The Vacillations of Poppy Carew (1995)
- 6 March – She's Out (1995)
- 9 March – Chiller (1995)
- 12 March – Band of Gold (1995–1997)
- 15 March – Cone Zone (1995–1997)
- 4 April – My Good Friend (1995–1996)
- 5 April – Sharman (1995–1996)
- 13 April – The Baldy Man (1995–1998)
- 17 April – A Village Affair (1995)
- 6 May – Scratchy & Co. (1995–1998)
- 14 May – The Governor (1995–1996)
- 22 May – Bramwell (1995–1998)
- 23 May – Dangerous Lady (1995)
- 5 June – The Caribou Kitchen (1995–1998)
- 8 June – Searching (1995)
- 10 July – Barbara (1995–2003)
- 17 July – Sometime, Never (1995–1996)
- 2 September
  - Gladiators: Train 2 Win (1995–1998)
  - Raise the Roof (1995–1996)
- 4 September – The Slow Norris (1995–1999)
- 5 September –
  - The Twisted Tales of Felix the Cat (1995–1997)
  - Mr. Men and Little Miss (1995–1997)
- 6 September – The Perfect Match (1995)
- 7 September – Fantomcat (1995–1996)
- 8 September – Jays' World (1995–1997)
- 10 September – The Famous Five (1995–1997)
- 11 September – The Singing Kettle News (1995–2000)
- 12 September – Is It Legal? (1995–1998)
- 9 October – Wolves, Witches and Giants (1995–1999)
- 11 October – Bliss (1995–1997)
- 24 October – Sylvester and Tweety Mysteries (1995–2000)
- 25 October – Paparazzo (1995)
- 26 October – My Kind of People (1995)
- 27 October – Freakazoid! (1995–1997)
- 17 November – Faith in the Future (1995–1998)
- 19 November – The Beatles Anthology (1995–1996)
- 10 December – Pinky and the Brain (1995–1998)
- 25 December – The Little Engine That Could (1991)
- 26 December – The Snow Queen (1995)
- 28 December – McCallum (1995–1998)

=== Channel 4 ===
- 1 February – ER (1994–2009)
- 16 February – Hearts and Minds (1995)
- 20 March – Deadline (1995)
- 21 April – Father Ted (1995–1998)
- 28 April – Friends (1994–2004)
- 4 May – Paul Merton's Life of Comedy (1995)
- 16 May – The Politician's Wife (1995)
- 21 May – A Personal Journey with Martin Scorsese Through American Movies (1995)
- 4 September – One for the Road (1995)
- 20 September – Absolutely Animals (1995–1998)
- 12 October – Jake's Progress (1995)
- 23 October – Hollyoaks (1995–present)
- 13 November – Porkpie (1995–1996)
- 24 November – Dressing for Breakfast (1995–1998)
- 25 November – England, My England (1995)
- 24 December – The Adventures of Mole (1995)

=== S4C ===
- 11 September – Rownd a Rownd (1995–present)

=== The Paramount Channel ===
- 15 November – Dr. Katz, Professional Therapist (1995–2002)

== Channels ==
=== New channels ===
Date	Channel
16 January	BBC World
26 January	BBC World
26 January	BBC Prime
30 January	BBC Prime
27 February	European Business News
1 June	SelecTV
2 June	Television X – The Fantasy Channel
12 June	L!VE TV
1 October	The Disney Channel
1 October	Sci-Fi Channel
1 October	Christian Channel Europe
1 November	The Paramount Channel
1 November	Sky Sports Gold
1 November	The History Channel
1 November	Playboy TV
20 November	Zee TV

=== Defunct channels ===
Date	Channel
16 January	BBC World Service Television
26 January	BBC World Service Television
March	TV Asia
31 May	Wire TV

== Television shows ==
=== Returning this year after a break of one year or longer ===
- Gambit (1975–1985, 1995)
- Boon (1986–1992, 1995)
- Chain Letters (1987–1990, 1995–1997)
- The Price Is Right (1984–1988, 1995–2001, 2006–2007)

== Continuing television shows ==
=== 1920s ===
- BBC Wimbledon (1927–1939, 1946–2019, 2021–present)

=== 1930s ===
- Trooping the Colour (1937–1939, 1946–2019, 2023–present)
- The Boat Race (1938–1939, 1946–2019, 2021–present)
- BBC Cricket (1939, 1946–1999, 2020–2024)

=== 1940s ===
- Come Dancing (1949–1998)

=== 1950s ===
- Panorama (1953–present)
- What the Papers Say (1956–2008)
- The Sky at Night (1957–present)
- Blue Peter (1958–present)
- Grandstand (1958–2007)

=== 1960s ===
- Coronation Street (1960–present)
- Songs of Praise (1961–present)
- World in Action (1963–2000)
- Top of the Pops (1964–2006)
- Match of the Day (1964–present)
- Mr. and Mrs. (1965–1999)
- Jackanory (1965–1996, 2006)
- Sportsnight (1965–1997)
- Call My Bluff (1965–2005)
- The Money Programme (1966–2010)

=== 1970s ===
- Emmerdale (1972–present)
- Newsround (1972–present)
- Pebble Mill (1972–1986, 1991–1996)
- Last of the Summer Wine (1973–2010)
- That's Life! (1973–1994)
- Wish You Were Here...? (1974–2003)
- Arena (1975–present)
- Jim'll Fix It (1975–1994)
- One Man and His Dog (1976–present)
- Grange Hill (1978–2008)
- Ski Sunday (1978–present)
- The Paul Daniels Magic Show (1979–1994)
- Antiques Roadshow (1979–present)
- Question Time (1979–present)

=== 1980s ===
- Family Fortunes (1980–2002, 2006–2015, 2020–present)
- Children in Need (1980–present)
- Danger Mouse (1981–1992, 2015–2019)
- Timewatch (1982–present)
- Brookside (1982–2003)
- Countdown (1982–present)
- Right to Reply (1982–2001)
- First Tuesday (1983–1993)
- Highway (1983–1993)
- Blockbusters (1983–93, 1994–95, 1997, 2000–01, 2012, 2019)
- Spitting Image (1984–1996)
- Surprise Surprise (1984–2001, 2012–2015)
- The Bill (1984–2010)
- Channel 4 Racing (1984–2016)
- Thomas the Tank Engine & Friends (1984–present)
- Busman's Holiday (1985–1993)
- EastEnders (1985–present)
- The Cook Report (1987–1999)
- Crosswits (1985–1998)
- Screen Two (1985–1998)
- Telly Addicts (1985–1998)
- Blind Date (1985–2003, 2017–2019)
- Comic Relief (1985–present)
- ScreenPlay (1986–1993)
- Beadle's About (1986–1996)
- The Chart Show (1986–1998, 2008–2009)
- Equinox (1986–2006)
- The Really Wild Show (1986–2006)
- Casualty (1986–present)
- Every Second Counts (1986–1993)
- Lovejoy (1986–1994)
- The Raggy Dolls (1986–1994)
- Allsorts (1987–1995)
- Going Live! (1987–1993)
- Watching (1987–1993)
- Going for Gold (1987–1996, 2008–2009)
- The Time, The Place (1987–1998)
- Chain Letters (1987–1997)
- ChuckleVision (1987–2009)
- Count Duckula (1988–1993)
- You Rang, M'Lord? (1988–1993)
- You Bet! (1988–1997)
- Playdays (1988–1997)
- Wheel of Fortune (1988–2001)
- London's Burning (1988–2002)
- On the Record (1988–2002)
- Fifteen to One (1988–2003, 2013–2019)
- This Morning (1988–present)
- Fun House (1989–1999)
- Absolutely (1989–1993)
- KYTV (1989–1993)
- Press Gang (1989–1993)
- Birds of a Feather (1989–1998, 2014–2020)
- A Bit of Fry & Laurie (1989–1995)
- Byker Grove (1989–2006)
- Desmond's (1989–1994)
- Bodger & Badger (1989–1999)
- Children's Ward (1989–2000)
- Mike and Angelo (1989–2000)

=== 1990s ===
- Mr. Bean (1990–1995)
- The Crystal Maze (1990–1995, 2016–2020)
- Keeping Up Appearances (1990–1995)
- Turnabout (1990–1996)
- The Upper Hand (1990–1996)
- Drop the Dead Donkey (1990–1998)
- One Foot in the Grave (1990–2000)
- MasterChef (1990–2001, 2005–present)
- How 2 (1990–2006)
- Stars in Their Eyes (1990–2006, 2015)
- The Dreamstone (1990–1995)
- Rosie and Jim (1990–2000)
- Big Break (1991–2002)
- Spender (1991–1993)
- The Brittas Empire (1991–1997)
- Bottom (1991–1995)
- Soldier Soldier (1991–1997)
- Noel's House Party (1991–1999)
- 2point4 Children (1991–1999)
- Little Dracula (1991–1999)
- Where's Wally?: The Animated Series (1991)
- GamesMaster (1992–1998)
- Heartbeat (1992–2010)
- Men Behaving Badly (1992–1998)
- The Big Breakfast (1992–2002)
- 999 (1992–2003)
- Sooty & Co. (1993–1998)
- Mr. Motivator exercise routines (1993–2000)
- Breakfast with Frost (1993–2005)
- Terror Towers (1994–1996)
- Ky’s Cartoons (1994–1999)
- Animal Hospital (1994–2004)
- The National Lottery Draws (1994–2017)
- Time Team (1994–2013)
- The Vicar of Dibley (1994–2007)
- Wipeout (1994–2003)
- Frasier (1993–2004)
- Wycliffe (1994–1998)
- Top of the Pops 2 (1994–present)

== Ending this year ==
- The Tomorrow People (1973–1979, 1992–1995)
- Why Don't You? (1973–1995)
- We Are the Champions (1973–1995)
- Gambit (1975–1985, 1995)
- The Krypton Factor (1977–1995, 2009–2010)
- Bullseye (1981–1995, 2006)
- Blockbusters (1983–1995)
- Boon (1986–1992, 1995)
- The DJ Kat Show (1986–1995)
- Allsorts (1986–1995)
- A Bit of Fry & Laurie (1989–1995)
- Challenge Anneka (1989–1995, 2006)
- Keeping Up Appearances (1990–1995)
- The Crystal Maze (1990–1995, 2016–2020)
- The Dreamstone (1990–1995)
- Mr. Bean (1990–1995)
- Bottom (1991–1995)
- What's Up Doc? (1992–1995)
- The Animals of Farthing Wood (1993–1995)
- The Legends of Treasure Island (1993–1995)
- Alphabet Castle (1993–1995)
- The High Life (1994–1995)
- Arthur C. Clarke's Mysterious Universe (1994–1995)
- Don't Forget Your Toothbrush (1994–1995)
- Scavengers (1994–1995)
- Incredible Games (1994–1995)
- Knowing Me Knowing You (1994–1995)
- The All New Alexei Sayle Show (1994–1995)
- Ain't Misbehavin' (1994–1995)
- Castles (1995)

== Births ==
- 23 January – Holly Kenny, actress
- 1 February – Richard Wisker, actor, singer and presenter
- 10 February – Archie Madekwe, actor
- 30 March – Simone Ashley, actress
- 16 April – Poppy Lee Friar, actress
- 17 April – Phoebe Dynevor, actress
- 4 May – Alex Lawther, actor
- 9 July – Georgie Henley, actress
- 26 August – Hannah van der Westhuysen, actress
- 27 August – Jessie Mei Li, actress
- 31 August – Ceallach Spellman, actor and radio DJ
- 26 September – Chloe Burrows, TV personality
- 15 November – Amy James-Kelly, actress

== Deaths ==
Date	Name	Age	Cinematic Credibility
7 January	Larry Grayson	71	comedian and television presenter
9 January	Peter Cook	57	comedian and actor
23 January	Ken Hill	57	television scriptwriter
30 January	Gerald Durrell	70	naturalist, writer and presenter of natural history programmes
2 February	Donald Pleasence	75	actor
8 February	Rachel Thomas	89	actress (Pobol y Cwm)
23 February	John Paul	73	actor (Marcus Agrippa in I, Claudius)
7 March	Ivan Craig	83	actor
11 March	Myfanwy Talog	50	actress
17 March	Donald Baverstock	71	television producer and executive
21 March	Robert Urquhart	72	actor (Pathfinders, Brideshead Revisited)
22 March	Peter Woods	64	BBC journalist and newsreader
4 April	Kenny Everett	50	comedic performer and DJ
15 April	Michael Aldred	49	television presenter (Ready Steady Go!)
16 April	Arthur English	75	actor (The Ghosts of Motley Hall, Are You Being Served?, In Sickness and in Health)
2 May	Michael Hordern	83	actor (narrator of Paddington Bear and voice of badger from The Wind in the Willows)
10 May	Harold Berens	92	actor and comedian
11 May	John Phillips	80	actor (Z-Cars)
15 May	Eric Porter	67	actor (Winston Churchill: The Wilderness Years, The Jewel in the Crown)
22 May	Robert Flemyng	85	actor (Compact)
15 June	Charles Bennett	95	television scriptwriter
18 June	Arthur Howard	85	actor
29 June	Noel Dyson	78	actress (Coronation Street, Father, Dear Father)
12 July	Michael Clegg	62	naturalist and television presenter
12 July	Gordon Flemyng	61	television producer
10 September	Derek Meddings	64	television special effects designer
12 September	Jeremy Brett	59	actor (Sherlock Holmes in The Adventures of Sherlock Holmes)
29 September	Susan Fleetwood	51	actress (The Buddha of Suburbia, Lovejoy)
6 October	Anthony Newlands	70	actor (The Avengers)
12 October	Gary Bond	55	actor
16 October	Richard Caldicot	87	actor (Some Mothers Do 'Ave 'Em)
4 November	Marti Caine	51	actress, dancer, presenter, singer, writer and comedian
4 November	Paul Eddington	68	actor (The Good Life and Yes Minister)
3 December	Jimmy Jewel	85	actor (Funny Man)
9 December	Benny Lee	79	actor (Are You Being Served?)

== See also ==
- 1995 in British music
- 1995 in British radio
- 1995 in the United Kingdom
- List of British films of 1995
