= 1995 in British radio =

This is a list of events in British radio during 1995.

== Events ==
=== January ===
- Undated in January
  - As part of major changes on the network, older music (generally pre-1990 recordings) is largely removed from the Radio 1 daytime playlist.
  - Radio Harmony (Coventry) is rebranded as Kix 96 and changes frequency.

=== February ===
- 14 February – Talk Radio UK becomes the last of three national commercial radio stations to go on air. It broadcasts on the mediumwave frequencies previously occupied by Radio 1.

=== March ===
- No events.

=== April ===
- 10 April – Virgin Radio starts broadcasting on FM in London. The station is a full simulcast of the national service apart from a 45-minute weekday early evening program. Consequently, at around this time, the national station is rebranded from Virgin 1215 to Virgin Radio.
- 15 April – BBC Radio 3 launches a weekly music discussion programme called Private Passions.
- 21 April – Steve Wright and Bruno Brookes present their final shows for BBC Radio 1. Both had been at the station for more than ten years.
- 23 April – Following Bruno Brookes's departure, Mark Goodier begins his second stint as presenter of the Sunday afternoon Top 40 show.
- 24 April – Chris Evans takes over the Radio 1 Breakfast Show from Steve Wright.

=== May ===
- Undated in May – BBC CWR closes as a stand-alone station and becomes an opt-out of BBC Radio WM.

=== June ===
- 2–3 June – The BBC last uses the Paris Theatre in central London as a venue for recording and broadcasting radio comedy and music with a live audience.

=== July ===
- Undated in July – The Radio Authority gives permission to GWR Group to begin programme networking across many of its FM stations. This landmark ruling begins the move by commercial radio companies in the UK to replace locally produced shows with networking.

=== August ===
- Rather than merely broadcasting the usual mix of non-stop music and promos, Heart 106.2's test transmissions include live broadcasts of New York station WPLJ. The station launches on 5 September.

=== September ===
- 16 September – Panic by Harrison Birtwistle features in the last night of the BBC Proms, becoming a succès de scandale.
- 27 September – The BBC begins regular Digital Audio Broadcasting, from the Crystal Palace transmitting station.
- September – "Shock jock" 'Caesar the Geezer' is dismissed from Talk Radio UK along with fellow controversial presenter Terry Christian as part of a station shakeup to tackle sagging ratings.

=== October ===
- 9 October
  - BBC Radio 3 begins broadcasting an hour earlier on weekdays with breakfast show On Air extended from two hours to three hours.
  - Paul Gambaccini joins Radio 3 to present a new morning program called Morning Collection. Consequently, This Week's Composer moves to the later time of 12noon.
- 21 October – Johnnie Walker ends his third and final stint at BBC Radio 1.

=== November to December ===
- No events.

=== Undated ===
- The roll-out of BBC Radio 1's FM network is completed this year, eight years after the switching on of the station's first FM transmitter, and the station now has the same coverage on FM as the other BBC national stations. The completion sees the station revert to being called Radio 1 on air, as opposed to Radio 1 FM, or even simply 1FM, which had been used since the start of the decade to promote the station's move to FM.

== Station debuts ==
- 1 January –
  - Gemini FM and Gemini AM
  - Choice FM Birmingham
- 9 January – Tay AM
- 9 January – Tay FM
- 9 January – Northsound One
- 9 January – Northsound Two
- 14 February – Talk Radio UK
- 10 April – Virgin Radio 105.8
- 30 May – Radio XL
- 10 June – Premier Christian Radio
- 25 June – Vale FM
- 3 July – Viva 963
- 8 July – KMFM
- 17 August – London Turkish Radio
- 5 September – Heart 106.2
- 9 September – Sabras Sound
- 24 September – Amber Radio
- 30 September –
  - CFM West Cumbria
  - Sound Wave
- 30 November – 103.2 Alpha Radio

== Programme debuts ==
- 5 January – In the Red on BBC Radio 4 (1995)
- 20 February – Alan Parker on BBC Radio 1 (1995)
- February
  - The Afternoon Shift on BBC Radio 4 (1995–1998)
  - Barrymore Plus Four on BBC Radio 4 (1995)
- 15 April – Private Passions on BBC Radio 3 (1995–Present)
- 19 April – Sunday Night at 10 on BBC Radio 2 (1995–2013)
- 31 May – Any Other Business on BBC Radio 4 (1995)
- June – This Sceptred Isle on BBC Radio 4 (1995–1996 +Extensions)
- 7 December – Change at Oglethorpe on BBC Radio 2 (1995–1996)

== Continuing radio programmes ==
=== 1940s ===
- Sunday Half Hour (1940–2018)
- Desert Island Discs (1942–Present)
- Letter from America (1946–2004)
- Woman's Hour (1946–Present)
- A Book at Bedtime (1949–Present)

=== 1950s ===
- The Archers (1950–Present)
- The Today Programme (1957–Present)
- Sing Something Simple (1959–2001)
- Your Hundred Best Tunes (1959–2007)

=== 1960s ===
- Farming Today (1960–Present)
- In Touch (1961–Present)
- The World at One (1965–Present)
- The Official Chart (1967–Present)
- Just a Minute (1967–Present)
- The Living World (1968–Present)
- The Organist Entertains (1969–2018)

=== 1970s ===
- PM (1970–Present)
- Start the Week (1970–Present)
- Week Ending (1970–1998)
- You and Yours (1970–Present)
- I'm Sorry I Haven't a Clue (1972–Present)
- Good Morning Scotland (1973–Present)
- Kaleidoscope (1973–1998)
- Newsbeat (1973–Present)
- The News Huddlines (1975–2001)
- File on 4 (1977–Present)
- Money Box (1977–Present)
- The News Quiz (1977–Present)
- Breakaway (1979–1998)
- Feedback (1979–Present)
- The Food Programme (1979–Present)
- Science in Action (1979–Present)

=== 1980s ===
- In Business (1983–Present)
- Sounds of the 60s (1983–Present)
- Loose Ends (1986–Present)

=== 1990s ===
- The Moral Maze (1990–Present)
- Essential Selection (1991–Present)
- No Commitments (1992–2007)
- The Mark Steel Solution (1992–1996)
- The Masterson Inheritance (1993–1995)
- Harry Hill's Fruit Corner (1993–1997)
- The Pepsi Chart (1993–2002)
- Wake Up to Wogan (1993–2009)
- Essential Mix (1993–Present)
- Up All Night (1994–Present)
- Wake Up to Money (1994–Present)
- Collins and Maconie's Hit Parade (1994–1997)
- Julie Enfield Investigates (1994–1999)

== Ending this year ==
- February – Anderson Country (1994–1995)
- March –
  - Alan Parker (1995)
  - Barrymore Plus Four (1995)
- July – Any Other Business on BBC Radio 4 (1995)
- 20 December – Lee and Herring (1994–1995)
- 25 December – The Masterson Inheritance (1993–1995)
- Unknown – Alan's Big One (1994–1995)

== Closing this year ==
- Sunrise East Midlands (1992–1995)

== Births ==
- 29 July – Nikita Kanda, radio presenter

== Deaths ==
- 7 January – Larry Grayson, 71, comedian and presenter (Late Night Larry)
- 30 January – Gerald Durrell, 70, naturalist, zookeeper, author and broadcast presenter
- 5 March – Vivian Stanshall, 51, comic singer-songwriter and broadcaster
- 4 April – Kenny Everett, 50, radio disc jockey and broadcast entertainer
- 16 April – Arthur English, 75, comedian
- 18 August – Alan Dell, 71, BBC radio presenter
- 4 November – Paul Eddington, 68, actor
- 24 November – Stuart Henry, 54, DJ

== See also ==
- 1995 in British music
- 1995 in British television
- 1995 in the United Kingdom
- List of British films of 1995
