= List of British films of 1995 =

A list of British films released in 1995.

== 1995 ==
Title	Director	Cast	Genre	Notes
1995
Angels and Insects	Philip Haas	Mark Rylance, Patsy Kensit, Kristin Scott Thomas	Drama	
A Close Shave	Nick Park	Peter Sallis, Anne Reid	Family	
An Awfully Big Adventure	Mike Newell	Hugh Grant, Alan Rickman	Comedy	
Babe	Chris Noonan	James Cromwell, Magda Szubanski	Comedy-drama	
Balto	Simon Wells	Kevin Bacon, Bridget Fonda, Jim Cummings, Phil Collins, Bob Hoskins	Animated adventure	
Blue Juice	Carl Prechezer	Sean Pertwee, Catherine Zeta-Jones	Drama	
Branwen	Ceri Sherlock			
Butterfly Kiss	Michael Winterbottom	Amanda Plummer, Saskia Reeves	Drama	Entered into the 45th Berlin International Film Festival
Carrington	Christopher Hampton	Emma Thompson, Jonathan Pryce	Biopic	Won two awards at Cannes
Circle of Friends	Pat O'Connor	Chris O'Donnell, Minnie Driver	Drama	Co-production with the US and the Republic of Ireland
Clockwork Mice	Vadim Jean	Ian Hart, Catherine Russell, Rúaidhrí Conroy	Drama/Sport	
Dr. Jekyll and Ms. Hyde	David Price	Sean Young, Tim Daly	Comedy/horror	Co-production with the US
England, My England	Tony Palmer	Nicholas Ball, Simon Callow, Robert Stephens	Musical/historical	
The Englishman Who Went Up a Hill But Came Down a Mountain	Christopher Monger	Hugh Grant, Ian McNeice, Tara Fitzgerald	Comedy	Entered into the 19th Moscow International Film Festival
Feast of July	Christopher Menaul	Embeth Davidtz, Tom Bell, James Purefoy	Drama	
French Kiss	Lawrence Kasdan	Meg Ryan, Kevin Kline, Timothy Hutton, Jean Reno, François Cluzet, Suzan Anbeh	Romantic comedy	Co-production with France and the US
GoldenEye	Martin Campbell	Pierce Brosnan, Sean Bean, Famke Janssen	Spy/action	
The Grotesque	John-Paul Davidson	Alan Bates, Sting	Comedy	
The Hard Case	Guy Ritchie	Wale Ojo	Crime	Short film
Haunted	Lewis Gilbert	Aidan Quinn, Kate Beckinsale	Horror	
I.D.	Philip Davis	Reece Dinsdale, Warren Clarke	Drama	
Innocent Lies	Patrick Dewolf	Stephen Dorff, Gabrielle Anwar, Joanna Lumley	Thriller	Co-production with France
Jack and Sarah	Tim Sullivan	Richard E. Grant, Samantha Mathis	Romance/comedy	
Land and Freedom	Ken Loach	Ian Hart, Rosana Pastor	War	Entered into the 1995 Cannes Film Festival
Mad Dogs and Englishmen	Henry Cole	Elizabeth Hurley, Joss Ackland	Thriller	
Margaret's Museum	Mort Ransen	Helena Bonham Carter, Clive Russell	Drama	
A Month by the Lake	John Irvin	Vanessa Redgrave, Edward Fox	Romance	
Mute Witness	Anthony Waller	Marina Zudina, Fay Ripley, Evan Richards, Oleg Yankovsky	Horror	Co-production with Russia & Germany
Nothing Personal	Thaddeus O'Sullivan	Ian Hart, John Lynch	Drama	
Othello	Oliver Parker	Laurence Fishburne, Irène Jacob, Kenneth Branagh	Shakespearean	
P*U*L*S*E	David Mallet	Pink Floyd	Concert film	
The Passion of Darkly Noon	Philip Ridley	Brendan Fraser, Ashley Judd, Viggo Mortensen	Drama	
Persuasion	Roger Michell	Amanda Root, Ciarán Hinds, Susan Fleetwood	Literary drama	The film premiered on television in Britain, but was released theatrically in the US and other countries.
The Phoenix and the Magic Carpet	Zoran Perisic	Peter Ustinov, Dee Wallace	Family	
Pride and Prejudice	Simon Langton	Colin Firth, Jennifer Ehle, David Bamber	Literary drama	Based on the novel by Jane Austen
Richard III	Richard Loncraine	Ian McKellen, Annette Bening, Jim Broadbent	Literary drama	Entered into the 46th Berlin International Film Festival
Rough Magic	Clare Peploe	Bridget Fonda, Russell Crowe	Comedy/drama	Co-production with France and the US
Sister My Sister	Nancy Meckler	Joely Richardson, Jodhi May, Julie Walters	Drama	
The Steal	John Hay	Alfred Molina, Helen Slater	Comedy/thriller	
Stonewall	Nigel Finch	Guillermo Díaz, Frederick Weller, Duane Boutte	Drama	
Two Deaths	Nicolas Roeg	Sônia Braga, Patrick Malahide	Drama	
Two Nudes Bathing	John Boorman	John Hurt	Short	Screened at the 1995 Cannes Film Festival
Total Eclipse	Agnieszka Holland	Leonardo DiCaprio, David Thewlis, Romane Bohringer, Dominique Blanc	Erotic historic drama	Based on 1967 play by Christopher Hampton
Wild Side	Donald Cammell	Anne Heche, Joan Chen, Christopher Walken	Drama	

== See also ==
- 1995 in film
- 1995 in British music
- 1995 in British radio
- 1995 in British television
- 1995 in the United Kingdom
- List of 1995 box office number-one films in the United Kingdom
