= 1 Polish, 2 Biscuits & a Fish Sandwich =

Studio album by the Outhere Brothers
- Released: 1994
- Recorded: 1994
- Studio: The Playroom
- Genre: Hip hop; Eurodance
- Label: Elektra/Warner Bros.
- Producer: Lamar "Hula" Malone

The Outhere Brothers chronology
1 Polish, 2 Biscuits & a Fish Sandwich (1994)	The Party Album (1996)

1 Polish, 2 Biscuits & a Fish Sandwich is the debut album of hip-hop duo the Outhere Brothers, released in 1994. The album, whose title references a penis, buttocks, and a vagina, respectively, was investigated by the Crown Prosecution Service. Multiple versions of the album were released, each with different covers and modified/different track listings, while the group's follow-up LP The Party Album contained "clean" versions of many of the tracks, with alternative "radio-friendly" lyrics. Despite mostly favorable reviews, the album was commercially unsuccessful, achieving its highest peak in the UK, where it peaked at No. 56 on the UK Albums Chart.

== Critical reception ==
Professional ratings
Review scores
Source	Rating
AllMusic	2.5/5 stars
Music Week	3/5 stars
Muzik	3/5 stars

The album received mostly favorable reviews from critics. Music Week commented, "There's plenty more salacious hip-hop/house where the recent number-one Don't Stop (Wiggle Wiggle) came from."

== Track listing ==
=== UK version ===
1. "I Miss You"
2. "Don't Stop (Wiggle Wiggle)"
3. "Boom Boom Boom"
4. "La La La Hey Hey"
5. "Bring That Ass Over Here"
6. "I Want My Shit Back"
7. "Les Be in Luv"
8. "Let Me Be the One"
9. "On My Mind"
10. "Pass the Toilet Paper"
11. "Orgasm"
12. "Outhere Brothers Theme Song"
13. "Golden Shower"
14. "Phat Phat Phat"
15. "Interlude The Halle Jones Show"
16. "I'll Lick Your Pussy"
17. "Fuk U in the Ass" (Bend Over Mix)

=== Bonus tracks on alternative versions ===
1. "I Wanna"
2. "What Up?"
3. "I Wanna P"
4. "Chi Town People"
5. "Phat Phat Phat" (Where Dey At Mix)
6. "Players Get Lonely"
7. "Boom Boom Boom" (Smooth Mix)
8. "Oh Shit!" (New Zealand bonus track)

== Charts ==
Chart performance for 1 Polish, 2 Biscuits & a Fish Sandwich
Chart (1995–1996)	Peak position
Australian Albums (ARIA)	90
Dutch Albums (Album Top 100) The Remixes	64
UK Albums (OCC)	56
