= James Grout =

English actor (1927–2012)

- Born: James David Grout; 22 October 1927; Edmonton, London, England
- Died: 24 June 2012 (aged 84); Purton, Wiltshire, England
- Occupation: Actor
- Spouse: Noreen

James David Grout (22 October 1927 – 24 June 2012) was an English actor of radio and television. He was best known for playing Chief Superintendent Strange in Inspector Morse.

== Early life ==
Grout was born in Edmonton, London, the son of Beatrice Anne and William Grout. He trained to be an actor at RADA.

== Career ==
Grout's BBC Radio 4 appearances include Barliman Butterbur in the 1981 adaptation of The Lord of the Rings, headmaster Harry Beeston in all ten series of the Radio 4 comedy series King Street Junior (1985–1998), Professor Richard Whittingham in Andy Hamilton's Hell-based comedy Old Harry's Game (1995–2003), Rev. Timothy Carswell in The Secret Life of Rosewood Avenue (1991) and Any Other Business (1995).

Grout's television credits include Chief Inspector Prescott in Waste Land (series 17, episode 1 of Dixon of Dock Green, 1970), Dai Owen in Looking for Clancy (1975), Jonas Bradlaw in Murder Most English (1977), Superintendent Rafferty in Turtle's Progress (Series 1 only), Div. Supt. Albert Hallam in Juliet Bravo (1981), The Doctor in Shelley (1982), Mr McAllister in The Beiderbecke Affair (1984), the Inspector in The Box of Delights (1984), Professor George Bunn in A Very Peculiar Practice (1988), Granville Bennett in All Creatures Great and Small, Chief Superintendent Strange in Inspector Morse and Mr Justice "Ollie" Oliphant in Rumpole of the Bailey as well as the Chief Whip in Yes Minister. He also played William Rowland in The Girl on the Train in The Agatha Christie Hour (1982). He was nominated for a 1965 Tony Award for Best Supporting or Featured Actor (musical) for Half a Sixpence.

Grout's other television roles include George Batt in Mother Love (1989), and Mr Spenlow in David Copperfield for two episodes in 1999.

== Personal life ==
Grout married Noreen, a schooldays' sweetheart. In 1977, they moved on a whim from west London to Malmesbury, Wiltshire, where he contributed a column to the local paper, the Wiltshire Gazette and Herald.

Grout died on 24 June 2012, aged 84, at the Ashgrove nursing home in Purton, Wiltshire, after a long illness. Noreen survived him.
