= Total Eclipse (film) =

- U.S. theatrical release poster
- Directed by: Agnieszka Holland
- Written by: Christopher Hampton
- Produced by: Jean-Pierre Ramsay-Levi; Philip Hinchcliffe; Victor Glynn Co-Prod
- Starring: Leonardo DiCaprio; David Thewlis; Romane Bohringer; Dominique Blanc
- Cinematography: Yorgos Arvanitis
- Edited by: Isabelle Lorente
- Music by: Jan A.P. Kaczmarek
- Distributed by: Feature Film Company (United Kingdom); Fine Line Features (United States)
- Release date: 3 November 1995 (United States)
- Running time: 111 minutes
- Countries: United Kingdom; France; Belgium; Italy; United States
- Language: English
- Budget: €6,780,000
- Box office: $340,139 (US)

Total Eclipse is a 1995 historical drama film directed by Agnieszka Holland. The film is based on a 1967 play of the same name by Christopher Hampton, who adapted the play for the screen. Based on letters and poems, it presents a historically accurate account of the relationship between 19th-century French poets Arthur Rimbaud (Leonardo DiCaprio) and Paul Verlaine (David Thewlis). Warner Bros. has included the film in the catalogue of Warner Archive Collection.

== Background ==
Hampton's play entitled Total Eclipse had premiered in September 1968 at the Royal Court Theatre in London. It featured Victor Henry as Rimbaud, John Grillo as Verlaine, Michele Dotrice as Mathilde Verlaine, Nigel Hawthorne as Mauté de Fleurville and Kathleen Byron as Mme Mauté de Fleurville; a televised version of the play was broadcast on BBC2 on 10 April 1973, with Ian Hogg as Verlaine and Joseph Blatchley as Rimbaud.

== Plot ==
Poet Paul Verlaine meets Arthur Rimbaud's sister Isabelle in a café in Paris. Isabelle and her mother want Verlaine to hand over any copies he may still have of the deceased Rimbaud's poems so they can be burned. The film then shifts to an extended flashback centered on the past relationship between Verlaine and Rimbaud. When the teenaged Rimbaud sends his poetry to Verlaine from his home in the provinces in 1871, Verlaine impulsively invites him to his rich father-in-law's home in Paris, where he lives with his young, pregnant wife. Rimbaud displays no sense of manners or decency, scandalising Verlaine's pretentious, bourgeois in-laws.

The 27-year-old Verlaine is seduced by the 16-year-old Rimbaud's body and by the originality of his mind. The staid respectability of married life and easy, middle-class surroundings had been stifling Verlaine's admittedly sybaritic literary talent. Rimbaud acts as sadistically to Verlaine as Verlaine does to his young wife, whom he eventually deserts. A violent, itinerant relationship ensues between the two poets, the climax of which occurs in Brussels when a drunken and enraged Verlaine shoots Rimbaud. Verlaine is sentenced to a fine and two years in prison for sodomy and grievous bodily harm.

In prison, Verlaine converts to Christianity, to his former lover's disgust. After his release, he meets Rimbaud in Germany, vainly and mistakenly seeking to revive the relationship. The two men part, never to meet again. Bitterly renouncing literature in any form, Rimbaud travels the world alone, finally settling in Abyssinia (modern day Ethiopia) to run a "trading post". There, he has a mistress. A tumour in his right knee forces him back to France, where his leg is amputated. Nevertheless, the cancer spreads and he dies at age 37. When he dies, the image of one of his most famous poems, Le Dormeur du val, appears.

The extended flashback ends. During her conversation with Verlaine, Isabelle Rimbaud asserts that only the censored versions of Rimbaud's poetry should survive. Verlaine pretends to agree, but tears up her card after she leaves. Verlaine, drinking absinthe (to which he has become addicted), sees a vision of the sixteen-year-old Rimbaud. The vision includes a young Rimbaud walking alone on a mountain range, Verlaine proclaiming they were both happy together, and Rimbaud claiming to have finally found eternity.

== Cast ==
- Leonardo DiCaprio as Arthur Rimbaud
- David Thewlis as Paul Verlaine
- Romane Bohringer as Mathilde Mauté
- Dominique Blanc as Isabelle Rimbaud
- Felicie Pasotti Cabarbaye as Isabelle as a child
- Nita Klein as Rimbaud's mother
- James Thiérrée as Frédéric
- Emmanuelle Oppo as Vitalie
- Denise Chalem as Mrs. Mauté de Fleurville
- Andrzej Seweryn as Mr. Mauté de Fleurville
- Christopher Thompson as Carjat
- Bruce Van Barthold as Aicard
- Christopher Chaplin as Charles Cros
- Christopher Hampton as The Judge
- Mathias Jung as André
- Aza Declercq as prostitute

== Reception ==
=== Critical response ===
According to Rotten Tomatoes, 24% of 17 reviews are positive, with an average score of 4.5/10. Review aggregator Metacritic assigned the film a weighted average score of 42 out of 100 based on 17 critics, noting it received a lukewarm reception. Although some reviewers criticised DiCaprio's lack of a French accent, others praised his performance as "daring" and "dynamic".

A Variety review by Todd McCarthy describes it as a "poorly executed biographical film that fails to capture the artistic achievements of poets Arthur Rimbaud and Paul Verlaine, instead focusing excessively on their destructive personal relationship, which detracts from the film's intended exploration of their artistic contributions".

== See also ==
- A Season in Hell (1971)
- 1995 in film
- List of British films of 1995
