= Any Other Business =

Any Other Business is a radio program that aired from May 1995 to July 1995. There were six 35-minute episodes and it was broadcast on BBC Radio 4, and rebroadcast on BBC Radio 4 Extra. It starred John Duttine, Jan Ravens, June Whitfield, James Grout, and Toby Longworth. It was written by Lucy Flannery and produced by Liz Ansty.

"When long-serving council leader Roland Whittaker loses his seat to a Monster Raving Loony Party candidate with the same surname and initials, he is both flabbergasted and furious. Young Robin Whittaker (who conducted his entire campaign dressed in a chicken outfit and a Viking helmet) isn’t happy either – he only stood for election as a student prank."
