= Don't Stop (Wiggle Wiggle) =

1994 single by The Outhere Brothers

Single by the Outhere Brothers

from the album 1 Polish, 2 Biscuits & a Fish Sandwich
- Released: 1994
- Recorded: 1994
- Genre: Hip house; Eurodance; dirty rap
- Length: 4:45
- Label: Aureus
- Songwriters: Hula; Silk E.
- Producers: Hula; the Outhere Brothers

The Outhere Brothers singles chronology
"Pass the Toilet Paper" (1994)	"Don't Stop (Wiggle Wiggle)" (1994)	"Boom Boom Boom" (1995)

Music video
- "Don't Stop (Wiggle Wiggle)" on YouTube

"Don't Stop (Wiggle Wiggle)" is a song by American hip-house duo the Outhere Brothers, released in 1994, by label Aureus, as a single from their debut album, 1 Polish, 2 Biscuits & a Fish Sandwich (1994). "Don't Stop (Wiggle Wiggle)" topped the charts in Ireland, Spain, and the United Kingdom. Although the music video and radio edit of the song featured a remixed, clean version of the song, the original, explicit lyrics were featured on different versions of the track on the CD single. The video was a Box Top on British music television channel The Box in April 1995.

== Critical reception ==
Maria Jimenez from Music & Media noted that "sparse house beats, minimal effects and maximum foul language" are the basis for "Don't Stop (Wiggle Wiggle)".

== Chart performance ==
"Don't Stop (Wiggle Wiggle)" was a major hit on the charts on several continents and remains the duo's most successful song, along with "Boom Boom Boom". In Europe, the song topped the charts in Ireland, Spain, and the United Kingdom. In the latter country, the song peaked at the top of the UK Singles Chart on March 26, 1995 – for the week ending date April 1, 1995 – during its third week on the chart. In Spain, it debuted at the top position and spent a total of five weeks as number one in October 1994. It was a top-10 hit also in Belgium (2), Italy (10) and the Netherlands (3), as well as on the Eurochart Hot 100, where it peaked at number four in its third week on the chart. Outside Europe, "Don't Stop (Wiggle Wiggle)" peaked at number five in Australia, number 22 on the Billboard Hot Dance Club Play in the Outhere Brothers' native United States and number 29 in New Zealand. In West Asia, it became a top-30 hit in Israel, peaking at number 30 in April 1995.

== Track listings ==
- 12-inch maxi – UK (1995)
1. "Don't Stop (Wiggle Wiggle)" (OHB Club Version) – 4:40
2. "Don't Stop (Wiggle Wiggle)" (OHB Club Remix) – 4:58
3. "Don't Stop (Wiggle Wiggle)" (Ramirez Tribal Remix) – 4:23
4. "Don't Stop (Wiggle Wiggle)" (Itchy And Scratchy Vocal Mix) – 5:50
5. "Don't Stop (Wiggle Wiggle)" (Seb And Vernes Dub) – 5:28
- CD single – UK (1995)
1. "Don't Stop (Wiggle Wiggle)" (Townhouse Radio Edit) – 3:06
2. "Don't Stop (Wiggle Wiggle)" (Original Radio Version) – 3:19
3. "Don't Stop (Wiggle Wiggle)" (OHB Club Version) – 4:40
4. "Don't Stop (Wiggle Wiggle)" (Itchy & Scratchy Vocal Mix) – 5:50
5. "Don't Stop (Wiggle Wiggle)" (DFC Tribal Remix) – 4:20
6. "Don't Stop (Wiggle Wiggle)" (DFC Techno Remix) – 4:26

== Charts ==
=== Weekly charts ===
Chart (1994–1995)	Peak position
Australia (ARIA)	5
Austria (Ö3 Austria Top 40)	28
Belgium (Ultratop 50 Flanders)	2
Europe (Eurochart Hot 100)	4
Europe (European Dance Radio)	22
Ireland (IRMA)	1
Israel (Israeli Singles Chart)	30
Italy (Musica e dischi)	10
Netherlands (Dutch Top 40)	4
Netherlands (Single Top 100)	3
New Zealand (Recorded Music NZ)	29
Scotland (OCC)	1
Spain (AFYVE)	1
UK Singles (OCC)	1
UK Dance (OCC)	7
UK Airplay (Music Week)	31
UK Club Chart (Music Week)	28
UK Pop Tip Club Chart (Music Week)	3
US Hot Dance Club Play (Billboard)	22

=== Year-end charts ===
Chart (1994)	Position
Belgium (Ultratop 50 Flanders)	27
Netherlands (Dutch Top 40)	16
Netherlands (Single Top 100)	13

Chart (1995)	Position
Australia (ARIA)	33
Europe (Eurochart Hot 100)	64
UK Singles (OCC)	14
UK Pop Tip Club Chart (Music Week)	7

== Certifications ==
Region	Certification	Certified units/sales
Australia (ARIA)	Gold	35,000^{^}
United Kingdom (BPI)	Gold	400,000^{^}
^{^} Shipments figures based on certification alone.
