= Boom Boom Boom =

1995 single by The Outhere Brothers

Single by the Outhere Brothers

from the album 1 Polish, 2 Biscuits & a Fish Sandwich
- Released: June 5, 1995
- Genre: Eurodance; hip house; dirty rap
- Length: 3:15
- Label: Aureus
- Songwriters: Hula; Silk E.
- Producers: Hula; the Outhere Brothers

The Outhere Brothers singles chronology
"Don't Stop (Wiggle Wiggle)" (1995)	"Boom Boom Boom" (1995)	"La La La Hey Hey Hey" (1995)

Music video
- "Boom Boom Boom" on YouTube

"Boom Boom Boom" is a song by American hip house duo the Outhere Brothers, released in June 1995, by label Aureus, as the fourth single from their debut album, 1 Polish, 2 Biscuits & a Fish Sandwich (1994), and is also featured on their compilation albums The Fucking Hits (2002), and Dance History (2005). "Boom Boom Boom" peaked at numbers 54 and 65 on the US Cash Box Top 100 and Billboard Hot 100, respectively. Outside of the United States, it topped the charts in Germany, Ireland, and the United Kingdom. In the latter two countries, the song became the duo's second chart-topper. The original version contained sexually explicit lyrics which were removed for the radio edit but were retained in remixes of the track on the single.

American entertainment company BuzzFeed ranked "Boom Boom Boom" number 71 in their list of "The 101 Greatest Dance Songs of the '90s" in 2017.

== Chart performance ==
"Boom Boom Boom" was very successful on the chart on several continents, becoming the duo's biggest hit, along with "Don't Stop (Wiggle Wiggle)". In Europe, "Boom Boom Boom" topped the charts in Germany, Ireland, and the United Kingdom. In the latter country, "Boom Boom Boom" peaked at the top of the UK Singles Chart on July 2, 1995 – for the week ending date July 8, 1995 – during its fourth week on the chart, becoming The Outhere Brothers' second chart-topping song in Britain following "Don't Stop (Wiggle Wiggle)" in March 1995. "Boom Boom Boom" spent a total of four weeks at the top of the UK Singles Chart.

Additionally, the single entered the top ten in Austria (7), Denmark (8), Finland (6), France (3), Iceland (3), Italy (7), Norway (6), Spain (5), Sweden (2), and Switzerland (4), as well as on the Eurochart Hot 100, where it peaked at number three. Outside of Europe, "Boom Boom Boom" went to number-one on the RPM Dance/Urban chart in Canada and in Zimbabwe, number two in Australia, number eight in New Zealand, number 13 in Israel, and numbers 54 and 65 on the Cash Box Top 100 and the Billboard Hot 100 in the Outhere Brothers' native United States. The song was awarded with a gold record in France and New Zealand and a platinum record in Australia and the UK.

== Critical reception ==
In his weekly UK chart commentary, James Masterton wrote that "now the lads return with their second hit, possessing none of the novelty or even slight charm of the first. Top 20 on the name alone, but no further on its merits." Mark Sutherland from NME named it "this year's 'No Limits', only good." James Hamilton from Music Week's RM Dance Update said the song is "neither as blatantly filthy nor as good" as 'Don't Stop (Wiggle Wiggle)', describing it as a "similar catchy I say boom boom boom, now let me hear you say whey-yo chanter". Mark Frith from Smash Hits was very negative, giving it zero points out of five, adding, "Blimey! The Outhere Brothers have turned into Real 2 Reel. And they're still rubbish!"

== Music video ==
Two different music videos were produced for "Boom Boom Boom". The original video was later made available on YouTube in 2010 and had accumulated over 33 million views by December 2025. For the UK/Europe release, a second video was made with animated clips, among them the 1935 short Betty Boop and Grampy (similar to their previous UK release "Don't Stop (Wiggle Wiggle)") but this time, the Outhere Brothers themselves appeared in front of the footage. "Boom Boom Boom" was a Box Top for several weeks on British music television channel The Box from July 1995. It was also A-listed on Germany's VIVA in August, and the following month, MTV Europe put the video on break out rotation.

== Track listings ==
- 12-inch maxi – U.S.
1. "Boom Boom Boom" (TFX remix) – 4:32
2. "Boom Boom Boom" (ohb underground mix (part 2)) – 5:26
3. "Boom Boom Boom" (don't break my balls mix) – 4:13
4. "Boom Boom Boom" (OHB underground mix (part 4)) – 4:43
5. "Boom Boom Boom" (TFX instrumental remix) – 4:32
- 12-inch maxi – Italy
1. "Boom Boom Boom" (don't break the balls mix) – 4:10
2. "Boom Boom Boom" (OHB radio mix) – 3:34
3. "Boom Boom Boom" (OHB underground mix) – 5:26
4. "Boom Boom Boom" (OHB extended mix) – 4:55
- 12-inch maxi – France
1. "Boom Boom Boom" (don't break my balls mix 2) – 4:13
2. "Boom Boom Boom" (extended mix 2) – 4:45
3. "Boom Boom Boom" (underground mix 4) – 4:43
4. "Boom Boom Boom" (OHB underground mix 2) – 5:26
- 12-inch maxi – UK
1. "Boom Boom Boom" (don't break my balls long mix) – 4:13
2. "Boom Boom Boom" (TFX long mix) – 4:31
3. "Boom Boom Boom" (itchy and scratchy dub) – 6:55
- 12-inch maxi – Germany
1. "Boom Boom Boom" (extended mix)
2. "Boom Boom Boom" (don't break my balls mix 2)
3. "Boom Boom Boom" (underground mix 4)
4. "Boom Boom Boom" (OHB underground mix 2)
5. "Boom Boom Boom" (don't break my balls mix 1)
6. "Boom Boom Boom" (TFX club remix)
- CD single – France
1. "Boom Boom Boom" (don't break my balls radio mix) – 3:00
2. "Boom Boom Boom" (OHB radio mix) – 3:34
3. "Boom Boom Boom" (UK radio edit) – 3:20
- CD maxi – Australia
1. "Boom Boom Boom" (radio version)
2. "Boom Boom Boom" (TFX long mix)
3. "Boom Boom Boom" (itchy and scratchy dub)
4. "Boom Boom Boom" (OHB underground mix part 2)
5. "Boom Boom Boom" (OHB extended mix part 4)
6. "Boom Boom Boom" (OHB underground mix part 4)
- CD maxi – Remixes
1. "Boom Boom Boom" (lalala radio mix) – 3:59
2. "Boom Boom Boom" (UK radio mix) – 3:34
3. "Boom Boom Boom" (lalala remix) – 3:56
4. "Boom Boom Boom" (extended mix 2) – 4:45
5. "Boom Boom Boom" (don't break my balls mix 2) – 4:13

== Charts ==
=== Weekly charts ===
Chart (1995)	Peak position
Australia (ARIA)	2
Austria (Ö3 Austria Top 40)	7
Belgium (Ultratop 50 Wallonia)	31
Canada Dance/Urban (RPM)	1
Denmark (IFPI)	8
Europe (Eurochart Hot 100)	3
Europe (European Dance Radio)	8
Finland (Suomen virallinen lista)	6
France (SNEP)	3
Germany (GfK)	1
Iceland (Íslenski Listinn Topp 40)	3
Ireland (IRMA)	1
Israel (Israeli Singles Chart)	13
Italy (Musica e dischi)	7
Netherlands (Dutch Top 40)	15
Netherlands (Single Top 100)	22
New Zealand (Recorded Music NZ)	8
Norway (VG-lista)	6
Scotland (OCC)	1
Spain (AFYVE)	5
Sweden (Sverigetopplistan)	2
Switzerland (Schweizer Hitparade)	4
UK Singles (OCC)	1
UK Airplay (Music Week)	18
UK Pop Tip Club Chart (Music Week)	12
US Billboard Hot 100	65
US Dance Club Play (Billboard)	31
US Maxi-Singles Sales (Billboard)	43
US Top 40/Rhythm-Crossover (Billboard)	26
US Cash Box Top 100	54
Zimbabwe (ZIMA)	1

=== Year-end charts ===
Chart (1995)	Position
Australia (ARIA)	13
Canada Dance/Urban (RPM)	14
Europe (Eurochart Hot 100)	16
France (SNEP)	15
Germany (Media Control)	12
Iceland (Íslenski Listinn Topp 40)	71
Latvia (Latvijas Top 50)	43
Netherlands (Dutch Top 40)	123
New Zealand (RIANZ)	34
Sweden (Topplistan)	25
Switzerland (Schweizer Hitparade)	32
UK Singles (OCC)	11
UK Pop Tip Club Chart (Music Week)	40

Chart (1996)	Position
Australia (ARIA)	37
Europe (Eurochart Hot 100)	98

== Certifications ==
Region	Certification	Certified units/sales
Australia (ARIA)	Platinum	70,000^{^}
France (SNEP)	Gold	250,000^{*}
New Zealand (RMNZ)	Gold	5,000^{*}
United Kingdom (BPI)	Platinum	600,000^{‡}
^{*} Sales figures based on certification alone.^{^} Shipments figures based on certification alone.^{‡} Sales+streaming figures based on certification alone.
