= Timekeepers =

- Genre: Game show
- Presented by: Bill Dod
- Country of origin: United Kingdom
- Original language: English
- No. of series: 2
- No. of episodes: 73

Production
- Running time: 25 minutes
- Production companies: Action Time and BBC North

Original release
- Network: BBC1
- Release: 3 January 1995 – 2 February 1996

Timekeepers is a British game show that aired on BBC1 from 3 January 1995 to 2 February 1996. It was hosted by Bill Dod.

== Format ==
On each edition, three contestants were given five minutes of time at the outset and attempted to protect as much of it as possible. After four rounds, the contestant with the most time remaining on their clock won the game and went on to play the "March Against Time" final challenge. Results of this challenge were entered on a leaderboard; the contestants with the best standings during a series returned at its end to play for a major prize.

The sequence and structure of the rounds changed somewhat between the two series.

== Series 1 ==
=== Round 1 ===
Each contestant in turn was asked three questions about their fields of interest, and lost 10 seconds for each incorrect answer. The host made two passes through the field, for a total of six questions per contestant.

=== Round 2 ===
The host asked 12 toss-up questions on the buzzer. A correct response exempted that contestant from the next question and deducted 10 seconds from any opponents who were not currently exempt. A miss cost the contestant 10 seconds and exempted them from the current question. If time ran out on a question, any contestants who were not exempt lost 10 seconds.

=== Round 3 ===
The contestants were shown a 12-hour clock face with a different word at each hour position. The host read a toss-up clue whose answer could be formed by combining two of the words. Contestants had to respond by naming a time on the clock, using the first word for the hours and the second one for the minutes. (E.g. with SHORT at 10 and STOP at 1, the clue "Found between second and third base in baseball" would lead to SHORTSTOP and a time of 10:05.) A correct buzz-in answer deducted 10 seconds from both opponents, but a miss cost the contestant 10 seconds. No contestant could lose more than 10 seconds on a single clue.

Two sets of six clues each were played, with a new clock for the second set.

=== Round 4 ===
The host asked a series of toss-ups on the buzzer. A correct answer allowed the contestant to steal 10 seconds from either opponent, while a miss cost them 10 seconds. If no one buzzed-in on a question, all three contestants lost 10 seconds.

=== March Against Time ===
The contestant had 60 seconds to answer up to 15 questions, and could not return to passed or missed ones. They earned 5 seconds for each of their first ten correct answers and 10 seconds for each of the last five. Earned seconds were not immediately added to the clock; instead, once the round was over, they were added to any time remaining on the clock to determine the contestant's overall score for the day.

== Series 2 ==
=== Round 1 ===
Same as Series 1, Round 3.

=== Round 2 ===
Same as Series 1, Round 2.

=== Round 3 ===
A word clock was displayed with two words at each hour position. The first words of the pairs were numbered 1–12, while the second words were numbered 13–24. Each contestant played their own clock and had two minutes to solve six clues, giving both the clock time in 24-hour format and the correct answer for each. (E.g. with HUNCH at 23 and BACK at 17, the clue "The bell-ringer at Notre Dame was this" would lead to HUNCHBACK and a time of 2325. HUNCH becomes 2300 hours, and BACK becomes 25 minutes since it is at the 5 position.) Each incorrect answer or pass deducted 10 seconds from the two-minute clock. Once a contestant had played through all six clues, any time remaining was added to their score.

=== Round 4 ===
Same as Series 1, Round 4.

=== March Against Time ===
The contestant still had to answer 15 questions in 60 seconds, and earned 10 seconds per correct answer. Now, though, this time was added directly to the clock; once the round ended; the remaining time determined their standing on the leaderboard.

== Transmissions ==
Series	Start date	End date	Episodes
1	3 January 1995	20 February 1995	35
2	4 December 1995	2 February 1996	38
