= The Outhere Brothers =

American hip hop group

- Origin: Chicago, Illinois, U.S.
- Genres: Hip hop, hip house, Eurodance, dirty rap, comedy hip hop
- Years active: 1987–2002, 2005–present
- Labels: Elektra/Warner Bros., Warlock, Aureus
- Members: Keith "Malik" Mayberry; Lamar "Hula" Mahone

The Outhere Brothers are an American hip house and Eurodance duo from Chicago, composed of Keith "Malik" Mayberry and record producer Lamar "Hula" Mahone. While the duo achieved only moderate success in their native United States, two of their songs, "Boom Boom Boom" and "Don't Stop (Wiggle Wiggle)", topped the charts in Ireland and the United Kingdom in 1995. "Boom Boom Boom" also topped the charts in Germany and "Don't Stop (Wiggle Wiggle)" in Spain. In the same year, The Outhere Brothers also contributed to Molella's "If You Wanna Party", which also peaked within the top ten of the charts in Germany, Ireland, and the United Kingdom.

== Discography ==
=== Studio albums ===
List of albums, with selected chart positions
| Title | Album details | Peak chart positions | | |
| Title | Album details | AUS | NLD | UK |
|---|---|---|---|---|
| 1 Polish, 2 Biscuits & a Fish Sandwich | Released: 1994 | 90 | 64 | 56 |
| Party Album | Released: 1995 | 133 | — | 46 |
| The Other Side | Released: 1998 | — | — | — |

=== Compilation albums ===
- The Fucking Hits (2002)
- Dance History (2004)

=== Singles ===
| Year | Title | Peak chart positions | | | | | | | | | | Certifications (sales thresholds) | Album |
| Year | Title | US | AUS | AUT | FRA | GER | IRE | ITA | NLD | NZ | UK | Certifications (sales thresholds) | Album |
|---|---|---|---|---|---|---|---|---|---|---|---|---|---|
| 1993 | "Pass the Toilet Paper" | — | — | 10 | — | — | — | 3 | — | — | — | | 1 Polish, 2 Biscuits & a Fish Sandwich |
| 1994 | "Fuk U in the Ass" | — | — | — | — | 88 | — | — | 42 | — | — | | 1 Polish, 2 Biscuits & a Fish Sandwich |
| 1994 | "Don't Stop (Wiggle Wiggle)" | — | 5 | 28 | — | — | 1 | 13 | 3 | 29 | 1 | ARIA: Gold; BPI: Gold | 1 Polish, 2 Biscuits & a Fish Sandwich |
| 1995 | "Boom Boom Boom" | 65 | 2 | 7 | 3 | 1 | 1 | 7 | 22 | 8 | 1 | ARIA: Platinum; BPI: Gold; SNEP: Gold | 1 Polish, 2 Biscuits & a Fish Sandwich |
| 1995 | "La La La Hey Hey" | — | 42 | 22 | — | 29 | 8 | 13 | 20 | 18 | 7 | | 1 Polish, 2 Biscuits & a Fish Sandwich |
| 1995 | "If You Wanna Party" (with Molella) | — | 99 | 19 | 27 | — | 7 | 12 | — | — | 9 | | Party Album |
| 1997 | "Let Me Hear You Say 'Ole Ole'" | — | — | 40 | — | — | — | 19 | — | — | 18 | | The Other Side |
| 1998 | "Pass the Toilet Paper '98" | — | — | — | — | 88 | — | — | — | — | — | | Non-album single |
| 1998 | "Ae-Ah" | — | — | — | — | — | — | — | — | — | — | | The Other Side |
"—" denotes releases that did not chart
