= Barrymore Plus Four =

Short-lived British radio programme

- Running time: 30 minutes
- Country of origin: United Kingdom
- Language(s): English
- Home station: BBC Radio 4
- Starring: Michael Barrymore; Susie Blake; Robert Glenister; Harry Enfield; Ted Robbins
- Original release: February 1995 – March 1995
- No. of episodes: 8

Barrymore Plus Four was a short-lived radio programme that aired from February to March 1995. There were eight half-hour episodes and it was broadcast on BBC Radio 2. It starred Michael Barrymore, Susie Blake, Robert Glenister, Harry Enfield, and Ted Robbins.
