= Elliot Evans =

- Born: 19 December 1995 (age 30)
- Origin: Coventry, West Midlands, England, United Kingdom
- Genres: Pop
- Occupation: Singer
- Instrument: Vocals
- Years active: 2009 – present
- Label: VVR2
- Website: good-evans.blogspot.com

Elliot Evans (born 19 December 1995) is an English singer who reached the semi-finals of the third series of ITV variety show Britain's Got Talent, singing with his parents Estelle and Giles and young sisters Georgia and Olivia as family singing group Good Evans. He released his debut single, "I'll Be There", on 9 November 2009 as part of the Voice In a Million project. He was born in Coventry, West Midlands, England.

== History ==
=== Britain's Got Talent ===
In January 2009, the group auditioned for the third series of the ITV television show Britain's Got Talent.

For their audition, they performed I'll Be There by Jackson 5. The audience gave the family a standing ovation but Simon had a few words of advice for the group. He said that whilst he loved the kids singing he was put off by Estelle's and particularly Giles' vocals. He advised them to take a smaller role in the act and let the children perform. The other judges agreed. They received three yes votes and were put through to the next round. They were chosen as one of the 40 semi-finalists.

Reports at the time said that Evans' voice changed and wasn't able to hit the high notes. He was singing with his family at their home in Winsford Avenue, Allesley Park, when he noticed a change in his voice. He said "It's been worrying – I was singing when I noticed I couldn't speak properly because my voice was really croaky.

They performed for a second time in the semi-final on 29 May 2009. They sang "Breaking Free" from High School Musical, with Elliot providing the predominant vocal, and the parents doing the backing vocals. Piers buzzed during the performance, saying afterwards: 'It just doesn't work. Elliot is the star here.' Amanda said: 'Piers is talking utter rot and as a family man I am disgusted with him. She added: 'The girls were unbelievably adorable and you did brilliantly'. Simon Cowell said 'Elliot I don't think it was the right song for your voice. You're not going to win but you've all had a nice night out.'. The crowd booed his comments, so he said something more positive. "'The three kids probably have a future in showbusiness. How's that?' he concluded. The group failed to make it to the final.

=== Post Britain's Got Talent ===
Evans has recorded his first single and in January will be performing at London's O2 Arena supported by a 4,000-strong children's choir for the Voice In A Million project. He has been invited to sing in one of the solo spots at the arena concert on 28 January 2010. He will be singing Michael Jackson's "I'll Be There" – the song that took him to stardom on Britain's Got Talent – and will be backed by a 4,000 choir.

Evans recorded the track on 14 August 2009 at Shepperton Film Studios with a choir of 100 young voices. He was approached to lend his support which he readily agreed to give, he has also been involved with the NSPCC, National Society For the Prevention of Cruelty to Children. The track will support fostering and adoption. Ben Williams, of Classic Media Group at Shepperton Film Studios, said: “Elliot was fantastic to work with and handled the pressure of the recording studio with ease, a true professional. His down-to-earth nature made him very easy to work with".

The single, "I'll Be There", was released on 9 November 2009 to mark the start of National Adoption Week. The release is now available worldwide from iTunes and download stores.

According to VVR2 records' official website, Evans' next single will be a cover of "O-o-h Child" which was recorded in October 2009. It will be released in January 2010.

Evans joined Beverley Knight and X Factor contestants Harmony Hood to entertain the crowds at Coventry's Christmas lights switch-on on 29 November 2009. Evans performed "I'll Be There" at the African Music Awards in London on 17 October 2009. The event was dedicated in memory of the "King of Pop" Michael Jackson.

== Personal life ==
Evans currently lives in Coventry with his parents Estelle, and Giles, brother Christopher, (the non-singing member of the family, who was mentioned by Estelle on the Britain's Got Talent semi-final) and younger sisters Georgia, and Olivia. He attended Blue Coat in Terry Road, Coventry.

== Discography ==
=== Singles ===
Year	Song	Chart positions		Album
Year	Song	UK	IRL	Album
2009	"I'll Be There"	TBA	TBA	TBA
2010	"O-o-h Child"	TBA	TBA	TBA
