= How to Be a Little Sod =

1992 book by Simon Brett

- First edition (publ. Gollancz)
- Author: Simon Brett
- Illustrator: Tony Ross
- Publisher: Orion Publishing Group
- Publication date: 1992

How To Be A Little Sod is a 1992 humour book written by English author Simon Brett and illustrated by Tony Ross, published by Orion Publishing Group. It aims to show what a baby may think during their first year of development. The format is in a traditional diary style, listing selected days and events. The main character's name is never actually revealed in the story, the child is always referred to as 'baby.' We also do not find out the gender at any time, so readers can make up their own minds on these missing details. The book is written in the first person, referring as 'I' and shows the baby through their first year of life. The other characters include the mother, referred to as 'Her' and the father, known as 'Him.' There are also the two sets of grandparents, whose awkward get-togethers leave a chill in the air. The book covers a range of traditional development techniques, including the advancement to solid foods, learning to crawl and saying the first word. However, the book is not intended to be a parents guide. It is a fictional book which uses realistic elements.

== Contents ==
How to be a Little Sod goes through baby's first year of advances, including the first word, the first smile, three-month-old colic, and gas, among other topics. It's aimed at adults but can be read by a wide audience. It also briefly touches on potty training.

== Trilogy ==
How To Be A Little Sod is the first in a trilogy of books, the second being Little Sod's Next Step, and the third and final being Not Another Little Sod. Whilst no more were ever made, the three volumes are in diary format, showing developmental advances in a different way: looking from a different aspect. For example, 'Little Sod's Next Step' looks at walking, being potty trained, and also hints that a new baby could be on the way. The final book, 'Not Another Little Sod' includes the original child, now two and a half years old, and the newborn baby. The third book is the longest, with 143 pages, and involves sibling rivalry. The series was highly successful in the UK and spawned several reprints and an animated TV series. The books were originally published under 'Victor Gollancz,' and were later rebranded under 'Orion.'

'Little Sod's Next Step,' the second book in the series, was originally known as 'Look Who's Walking: Further Diaries of a Little Sod.' It was later changed for the 2000 release, as the publishers hoped the new title would appeal to a wider audience and fit in with the other titles in the series.

== Adaptations ==
How to Be a Little Sod was adapted into a BBC television release starring Rik Mayall in 1996. The series was released on video cassette and received a broadcasting certificate of '15'. The books are also available on audio tape.
