= Castles (TV series) =

- Genre: Soap opera
- Country of origin: United Kingdom
- Original language: English
- No. of series: 1
- No. of episodes: 24 (list of episodes)

Production
- Running time: 30 minutes
- Production company: BBC/Granada

Original release
- Network: BBC1
- Release: 31 May – 20 August 1995

Castles is a British soap opera following three generations of a large London family. It ran for 24 episodes on BBC One during the summer of 1995 and was a co-production by the BBC and Granada Television. Its writing team included Peter Whalley who was known for his work on Coronation Street and Sally Wainwright who would go on to create Scott & Bailey and Happy Valley.

== Scheduling ==
The first episode aired on 31 May 1995 at 7.30pm before settling into what was supposed to be its regular timeslot of Tuesday and Thursday at 8.30pm. Halfway through its run, with audiences averaging 3.2 million, BBC head of drama Charles Denton admitted that the show had not been a success, stating "A piece which sits in the middle of the schedule has obligations to deliver rather fuller levels of audience and enthusiasm than, I'm afraid, has happened with Castles". It was at this point that the series was moved to Monday and Sunday at 7.00pm, where a BBC spokesperson stated "it might better fulfil its potential". Throughout its run, repeats and omnibus editions were aired on weekday afternoons on both BBC One and BBC Two. As the series drew to a close, Radio Times reported that no final decision had been taken about the future of the show, but that writer Whalley was working on a second series. Ultimately, it was not picked up for a second run.

== Cast ==
Character	Actor
Margaret Castle	Anna Cropper
James Castle	Tony Doyle
Rachel Castle	Marian McLoughlin
Stephen Quinn	Ray Coulthard
Anita Castle	Sara Griffiths
Phillip Castle	Michael Simkins
Paul Castle	Simon Fenton
Helen Bancroft	Kate Steavenson-Payne
Linda Castle	Lesley Duff
Claire Castle	Harriet Owen
Alison Peacock	Emily Morgan
Tony Castle	John Bowler
Matthew Castle	Dominic Mafham
Sarah Milburn	Judith Scott
Alex Milburn	Christopher Bowen
Christine Henshaw	Lynn Farleigh
Joanne Henshaw	Louisa Millwood-Haigh
Mark Henshaw	Simon Bright
Jill Kirkpatrick	Sarah Berger

== Episode guide ==
Air Date	Timeslot	Synopsis
31 May 1995	19.30	In this introductory episode we meet the clan on the occasion of mother's 60th birthday party, an occasion overshadowed by her discovery that her husband has been carrying on with another woman.
6 June 1995	20.30	James Castle goes to see his mistress, Christine, who provisionally agrees to let him stay.
8 June 1995	20.30	Philip and Linda persuade James and Margaret to meet up.
13 June 1995	20.30	Sarah and Alex have a meeting with Laura from the adoption agency and not everyone is happy when Rachel arranges a family get-together to discuss what to do about Margaret and James.
15 June 1995	20.30	The family gathers to discuss what to do about Margaret and James. Meanwhile, Matthew secretly visits Margaret, who admits she would like to win James back.
20 June 1995	20.30	Paul helps Linda set up a meeting with Christine, while Margaret considers hiring a solicitor to deal with James.
22 June 1995	20.30	James gets angry when he discovers Linda and Christine having a heart-to-heart chat. Stephen, Anita and Rachel wrangle with Tony over the cost of the wedding.
27 June 1995	20.30	Sarah is interviewed on her own by Laura from the adoption agency while Alex is out working. Meanwhile, Alex receives a visit from Jill and their relationship becomes more intimate.
29 June 1995	20.30	Philip and Linda's son David unexpectedly comes home from university and drops a bombshell on his parents about his future plans.
4 July 1995	20.30	James visits Margaret after receiving her solicitor's letter. Sarah worries that she is neglecting Alex, while he confides in Jill about his reservations over the adoption.
6 July 1995	20.30	James is annoyed when Tony asks whether he intends to bring Christine to the wedding, though Christine turns out to have her own views on the matter.
9 July 1995	19.00	Tony is surprised when Adam turns up at his warehouse and suggests a way out of his business difficulties.
10 July 1995	19.00	Jill suggests a way that Alex can get out of the adoption without Sarah knowing.
16 July 1995	19.00	Tension grows between Christine and James over Joanne's disappearance. Matthew warns Margaret that the threat of divorce still stands.
17 July 1995	19.00	Alex is caught making a suspicious phone call to Jill. Tony receives gloomy news.
23 July 1995	19.00	Joanne returns home to Christine but her explanations for her disappearance cause Christine more concern than ever.
24 July 1995	19.00	Christine gets the truth from Joanne at last and Philip tries to talk David out of becoming a priest.
30 July 1995	19.00	Paul's plan to see Helen without her parents' consent has consequences for Philip and Linda.
31 July 1995	19.00	Sarah is aghast when Jane provides her with evidence of Alex's affair.
6 August 1995	19.00	Sarah comesface to face with her husband's mistress; Linda and Philip's displeasure with Paul shows no sign of subsiding; and Adam offers Tony some more business advice.
7 August 1995	19.00	Tony and Rachel's evening in with Anita and Stephen is interrupted by a policeman with devastating news.
13 August 1995	19.00	Alex tells Jill that Sarah knows of their affair; Stephen reacts badly to Anita's revelations; and Sarah comes up with an unusual proposal to prevent the collapse of the plans for the adoption.
14 August 1995	19.00	Alison is nervous about the first night of her play.
20 August 1995	19.00	Wedding day joy is shattered in the last of the series when the police arrive, looking for the groom.
