= England, My England =

1995 British historical film

- Directed by: Tony Palmer
- Written by: John Osborne; Charles Wood
- Produced by: Mike Bluett
- Starring: Simon Callow; Michael Ball; Rebecca Front; Lucy Speed
- Cinematography: Nicholas D. Knowland
- Production companies: Channel Four Films; Ladbroke Films
- Distributed by: Channel Four Films (UK; TV); NVC Arts (Worldwide); Warner Music Vision (UK; VHS)
- Release date: 25 November 1995 (UK)
- Running time: 153 min
- Country: United Kingdom
- Language: English

England, My England is a 1995 British historical film directed by Tony Palmer and starring Michael Ball, Simon Callow, Lucy Speed and Robert Stephens. It depicts the life of the composer Henry Purcell, seen through the eyes of a playwright in the 1960s who is trying to write a play about him. It was written by John Osborne and Charles Wood.

== Cast ==
- Simon Callow ... Charles II
- Michael Ball ... Henry Purcell
- Rebecca Front ... Mary II
- Lucy Speed ... Nell Gwyn
- Letitia Dean ... Lady Castlemaine
- Nina Young ... Frances Purcell
- John Shrapnel ... Samuel Pepys
- Robert Stephens ... John Dryden
- Terence Rigby ... Captain Henry Cooke
- Bill Kenwright ... Bill
- Murray Melvin ... Earl of Shaftesbury
- Corin Redgrave ... William of Orange
- John Fortune ... Edward Hyde, Earl of Clarendon
- Guy Henry ... James II
- Peter Woodthorpe ... Kiffen
- Edward Michie ... Young Harry
- Tom Shrapnel ... Young Pelham
- Antonia de Sancha ... Louise
- Constantine Gregory ... Colonel Wharton
- Rebecca Tremain ... Catherine of Bragança
- Vernon Dobtcheff ... Dr. Spratt
- Tim Newton ... Harry Purcell Snr
- Patricia Quinn ... Elizabeth Purcell
- David Thomas ... John Gostling
- James Saxon ... Vyner
- Michael John Wade ...Baron of Clifford and Chudleigh
- Brook Williams ... Priest
- Leslie Ashton ... Bishop
- David Spinx ... Smith
